

313001–313100 

|-bgcolor=#fefefe
| 313001 ||  || — || October 29, 1999 || Kitt Peak || Spacewatch || — || align=right data-sort-value="0.94" | 940 m || 
|-id=002 bgcolor=#d6d6d6
| 313002 ||  || — || October 31, 1999 || Kitt Peak || Spacewatch || — || align=right | 2.4 km || 
|-id=003 bgcolor=#d6d6d6
| 313003 ||  || — || October 6, 1999 || Socorro || LINEAR || EOS || align=right | 2.5 km || 
|-id=004 bgcolor=#fefefe
| 313004 ||  || — || October 29, 1999 || Anderson Mesa || LONEOS || — || align=right | 1.3 km || 
|-id=005 bgcolor=#fefefe
| 313005 ||  || — || October 30, 1999 || Anderson Mesa || LONEOS || — || align=right | 1.5 km || 
|-id=006 bgcolor=#d6d6d6
| 313006 ||  || — || November 2, 1999 || Kitt Peak || Spacewatch || — || align=right | 3.9 km || 
|-id=007 bgcolor=#fefefe
| 313007 ||  || — || November 2, 1999 || Kitt Peak || Spacewatch || — || align=right data-sort-value="0.85" | 850 m || 
|-id=008 bgcolor=#fefefe
| 313008 ||  || — || November 8, 1999 || Višnjan Observatory || K. Korlević || — || align=right | 1.7 km || 
|-id=009 bgcolor=#fefefe
| 313009 ||  || — || November 4, 1999 || Socorro || LINEAR || MAS || align=right | 1.00 km || 
|-id=010 bgcolor=#d6d6d6
| 313010 ||  || — || November 9, 1999 || Socorro || LINEAR || — || align=right | 4.3 km || 
|-id=011 bgcolor=#d6d6d6
| 313011 ||  || — || November 9, 1999 || Socorro || LINEAR || HYG || align=right | 3.7 km || 
|-id=012 bgcolor=#d6d6d6
| 313012 ||  || — || November 9, 1999 || Socorro || LINEAR || — || align=right | 4.1 km || 
|-id=013 bgcolor=#fefefe
| 313013 ||  || — || November 9, 1999 || Kitt Peak || Spacewatch || MAS || align=right data-sort-value="0.92" | 920 m || 
|-id=014 bgcolor=#d6d6d6
| 313014 ||  || — || November 15, 1999 || Socorro || LINEAR || — || align=right | 4.2 km || 
|-id=015 bgcolor=#fefefe
| 313015 ||  || — || November 5, 1999 || Socorro || LINEAR || MAS || align=right | 1.00 km || 
|-id=016 bgcolor=#fefefe
| 313016 ||  || — || November 5, 1999 || Socorro || LINEAR || — || align=right | 1.2 km || 
|-id=017 bgcolor=#fefefe
| 313017 ||  || — || November 28, 1999 || Kitt Peak || Spacewatch || NYS || align=right data-sort-value="0.81" | 810 m || 
|-id=018 bgcolor=#fefefe
| 313018 ||  || — || November 28, 1999 || Kitt Peak || Spacewatch || MAS || align=right data-sort-value="0.91" | 910 m || 
|-id=019 bgcolor=#fefefe
| 313019 ||  || — || November 16, 1999 || Kitt Peak || Spacewatch || MAS || align=right data-sort-value="0.97" | 970 m || 
|-id=020 bgcolor=#fefefe
| 313020 ||  || — || December 6, 1999 || Gnosca || S. Sposetti || NYS || align=right data-sort-value="0.87" | 870 m || 
|-id=021 bgcolor=#E9E9E9
| 313021 ||  || — || December 12, 1999 || Socorro || LINEAR || — || align=right | 3.5 km || 
|-id=022 bgcolor=#C2FFFF
| 313022 ||  || — || December 27, 1999 || Kitt Peak || Spacewatch || L4 || align=right | 8.8 km || 
|-id=023 bgcolor=#d6d6d6
| 313023 ||  || — || January 5, 2000 || Kitt Peak || Spacewatch || — || align=right | 3.0 km || 
|-id=024 bgcolor=#C2FFFF
| 313024 ||  || — || January 5, 2000 || Kitt Peak || Spacewatch || L4ERY || align=right | 11 km || 
|-id=025 bgcolor=#E9E9E9
| 313025 ||  || — || January 8, 2000 || Kitt Peak || Spacewatch || — || align=right | 2.0 km || 
|-id=026 bgcolor=#E9E9E9
| 313026 ||  || — || February 2, 2000 || Socorro || LINEAR || — || align=right | 1.2 km || 
|-id=027 bgcolor=#E9E9E9
| 313027 ||  || — || February 8, 2000 || Kitt Peak || Spacewatch || — || align=right | 1.2 km || 
|-id=028 bgcolor=#E9E9E9
| 313028 ||  || — || February 28, 2000 || Socorro || LINEAR || — || align=right | 1.4 km || 
|-id=029 bgcolor=#E9E9E9
| 313029 ||  || — || February 28, 2000 || Socorro || LINEAR || — || align=right | 1.4 km || 
|-id=030 bgcolor=#E9E9E9
| 313030 ||  || — || February 29, 2000 || Socorro || LINEAR || — || align=right | 1.2 km || 
|-id=031 bgcolor=#E9E9E9
| 313031 ||  || — || March 29, 2000 || Kitt Peak || Spacewatch || — || align=right | 1.8 km || 
|-id=032 bgcolor=#fefefe
| 313032 ||  || — || April 6, 2000 || Socorro || LINEAR || — || align=right data-sort-value="0.74" | 740 m || 
|-id=033 bgcolor=#E9E9E9
| 313033 ||  || — || May 1, 2000 || Kitt Peak || Spacewatch || MAR || align=right | 1.4 km || 
|-id=034 bgcolor=#E9E9E9
| 313034 ||  || — || May 27, 2000 || Socorro || LINEAR || — || align=right | 2.0 km || 
|-id=035 bgcolor=#E9E9E9
| 313035 ||  || — || July 31, 2000 || Kitt Peak || Spacewatch || BRG || align=right | 2.1 km || 
|-id=036 bgcolor=#fefefe
| 313036 || 2000 PL || — || August 2, 2000 || San Marcello || L. Tesi, M. Tombelli || FLO || align=right data-sort-value="0.79" | 790 m || 
|-id=037 bgcolor=#fefefe
| 313037 ||  || — || August 1, 2000 || Socorro || LINEAR || PHO || align=right | 1.5 km || 
|-id=038 bgcolor=#d6d6d6
| 313038 || 2000 QH || — || August 21, 2000 || Prescott || P. G. Comba || — || align=right | 2.3 km || 
|-id=039 bgcolor=#fefefe
| 313039 ||  || — || August 26, 2000 || Socorro || LINEAR || PHO || align=right | 1.3 km || 
|-id=040 bgcolor=#fefefe
| 313040 ||  || — || August 26, 2000 || Socorro || LINEAR || — || align=right data-sort-value="0.69" | 690 m || 
|-id=041 bgcolor=#FA8072
| 313041 ||  || — || August 28, 2000 || Socorro || LINEAR || PHO || align=right | 1.3 km || 
|-id=042 bgcolor=#fefefe
| 313042 ||  || — || August 28, 2000 || Socorro || LINEAR || — || align=right | 1.4 km || 
|-id=043 bgcolor=#fefefe
| 313043 ||  || — || August 31, 2000 || Socorro || LINEAR || H || align=right data-sort-value="0.82" | 820 m || 
|-id=044 bgcolor=#fefefe
| 313044 ||  || — || August 31, 2000 || Socorro || LINEAR || — || align=right data-sort-value="0.99" | 990 m || 
|-id=045 bgcolor=#fefefe
| 313045 ||  || — || August 26, 2000 || Socorro || LINEAR || PHO || align=right | 1.5 km || 
|-id=046 bgcolor=#fefefe
| 313046 ||  || — || August 25, 2000 || Socorro || LINEAR || — || align=right | 1.7 km || 
|-id=047 bgcolor=#d6d6d6
| 313047 ||  || — || August 29, 2000 || Socorro || LINEAR || — || align=right | 3.6 km || 
|-id=048 bgcolor=#fefefe
| 313048 ||  || — || August 31, 2000 || Socorro || LINEAR || — || align=right data-sort-value="0.74" | 740 m || 
|-id=049 bgcolor=#fefefe
| 313049 ||  || — || August 31, 2000 || Socorro || LINEAR || FLO || align=right data-sort-value="0.72" | 720 m || 
|-id=050 bgcolor=#fefefe
| 313050 ||  || — || August 31, 2000 || Socorro || LINEAR || V || align=right data-sort-value="0.94" | 940 m || 
|-id=051 bgcolor=#fefefe
| 313051 ||  || — || September 2, 2000 || Socorro || LINEAR || PHO || align=right | 1.6 km || 
|-id=052 bgcolor=#E9E9E9
| 313052 ||  || — || September 2, 2000 || Kitt Peak || Spacewatch || — || align=right | 2.7 km || 
|-id=053 bgcolor=#fefefe
| 313053 ||  || — || September 2, 2000 || Socorro || LINEAR || ERI || align=right | 2.1 km || 
|-id=054 bgcolor=#fefefe
| 313054 ||  || — || September 5, 2000 || Anderson Mesa || LONEOS || H || align=right data-sort-value="0.66" | 660 m || 
|-id=055 bgcolor=#fefefe
| 313055 ||  || — || September 23, 2000 || Socorro || LINEAR || — || align=right | 1.5 km || 
|-id=056 bgcolor=#FA8072
| 313056 ||  || — || September 23, 2000 || Socorro || LINEAR || — || align=right data-sort-value="0.80" | 800 m || 
|-id=057 bgcolor=#d6d6d6
| 313057 ||  || — || September 24, 2000 || Socorro || LINEAR || EOS || align=right | 2.6 km || 
|-id=058 bgcolor=#E9E9E9
| 313058 ||  || — || September 24, 2000 || Socorro || LINEAR || — || align=right | 3.7 km || 
|-id=059 bgcolor=#fefefe
| 313059 ||  || — || September 24, 2000 || Socorro || LINEAR || — || align=right data-sort-value="0.79" | 790 m || 
|-id=060 bgcolor=#fefefe
| 313060 ||  || — || September 24, 2000 || Socorro || LINEAR || — || align=right | 1.0 km || 
|-id=061 bgcolor=#fefefe
| 313061 ||  || — || September 24, 2000 || Socorro || LINEAR || — || align=right data-sort-value="0.95" | 950 m || 
|-id=062 bgcolor=#fefefe
| 313062 ||  || — || September 29, 2000 || Emerald Lane || L. Ball || — || align=right | 1.1 km || 
|-id=063 bgcolor=#fefefe
| 313063 ||  || — || September 24, 2000 || Socorro || LINEAR || — || align=right data-sort-value="0.88" | 880 m || 
|-id=064 bgcolor=#fefefe
| 313064 ||  || — || September 23, 2000 || Socorro || LINEAR || — || align=right | 1.0 km || 
|-id=065 bgcolor=#fefefe
| 313065 ||  || — || September 24, 2000 || Socorro || LINEAR || — || align=right data-sort-value="0.79" | 790 m || 
|-id=066 bgcolor=#fefefe
| 313066 ||  || — || September 24, 2000 || Socorro || LINEAR || — || align=right | 1.2 km || 
|-id=067 bgcolor=#fefefe
| 313067 ||  || — || September 27, 2000 || Socorro || LINEAR || H || align=right data-sort-value="0.77" | 770 m || 
|-id=068 bgcolor=#fefefe
| 313068 ||  || — || September 24, 2000 || Socorro || LINEAR || PHO || align=right | 1.1 km || 
|-id=069 bgcolor=#fefefe
| 313069 ||  || — || September 28, 2000 || Socorro || LINEAR || — || align=right | 1.2 km || 
|-id=070 bgcolor=#fefefe
| 313070 ||  || — || September 26, 2000 || Socorro || LINEAR || — || align=right | 1.00 km || 
|-id=071 bgcolor=#fefefe
| 313071 ||  || — || September 27, 2000 || Socorro || LINEAR || — || align=right data-sort-value="0.94" | 940 m || 
|-id=072 bgcolor=#fefefe
| 313072 ||  || — || September 28, 2000 || Socorro || LINEAR || H || align=right data-sort-value="0.57" | 570 m || 
|-id=073 bgcolor=#fefefe
| 313073 ||  || — || September 24, 2000 || Socorro || LINEAR || FLO || align=right data-sort-value="0.95" | 950 m || 
|-id=074 bgcolor=#fefefe
| 313074 ||  || — || September 24, 2000 || Socorro || LINEAR || FLO || align=right data-sort-value="0.84" | 840 m || 
|-id=075 bgcolor=#fefefe
| 313075 ||  || — || September 26, 2000 || Socorro || LINEAR || PHO || align=right | 1.2 km || 
|-id=076 bgcolor=#d6d6d6
| 313076 ||  || — || September 24, 2000 || Socorro || LINEAR || — || align=right | 3.8 km || 
|-id=077 bgcolor=#d6d6d6
| 313077 ||  || — || September 27, 2000 || Socorro || LINEAR || — || align=right | 2.3 km || 
|-id=078 bgcolor=#fefefe
| 313078 ||  || — || September 23, 2000 || Anderson Mesa || LONEOS || H || align=right data-sort-value="0.74" | 740 m || 
|-id=079 bgcolor=#fefefe
| 313079 ||  || — || September 23, 2000 || Socorro || LINEAR || — || align=right | 1.2 km || 
|-id=080 bgcolor=#fefefe
| 313080 ||  || — || October 1, 2000 || Socorro || LINEAR || — || align=right data-sort-value="0.92" | 920 m || 
|-id=081 bgcolor=#fefefe
| 313081 ||  || — || October 1, 2000 || Socorro || LINEAR || — || align=right | 1.0 km || 
|-id=082 bgcolor=#fefefe
| 313082 ||  || — || September 26, 2000 || Haleakala || NEAT || V || align=right data-sort-value="0.88" | 880 m || 
|-id=083 bgcolor=#fefefe
| 313083 ||  || — || October 2, 2000 || Socorro || LINEAR || — || align=right data-sort-value="0.93" | 930 m || 
|-id=084 bgcolor=#d6d6d6
| 313084 ||  || — || October 6, 2000 || Anderson Mesa || LONEOS || — || align=right | 4.7 km || 
|-id=085 bgcolor=#FA8072
| 313085 ||  || — || October 1, 2000 || Socorro || LINEAR || — || align=right data-sort-value="0.77" | 770 m || 
|-id=086 bgcolor=#fefefe
| 313086 ||  || — || October 2, 2000 || Socorro || LINEAR || — || align=right data-sort-value="0.86" | 860 m || 
|-id=087 bgcolor=#FA8072
| 313087 ||  || — || October 18, 2000 || Socorro || LINEAR || — || align=right data-sort-value="0.96" | 960 m || 
|-id=088 bgcolor=#FA8072
| 313088 ||  || — || October 24, 2000 || Socorro || LINEAR || — || align=right data-sort-value="0.85" | 850 m || 
|-id=089 bgcolor=#fefefe
| 313089 ||  || — || September 28, 2000 || Socorro || LINEAR || NYS || align=right data-sort-value="0.86" | 860 m || 
|-id=090 bgcolor=#fefefe
| 313090 ||  || — || October 25, 2000 || Socorro || LINEAR || — || align=right | 1.3 km || 
|-id=091 bgcolor=#fefefe
| 313091 ||  || — || October 25, 2000 || Socorro || LINEAR || NYS || align=right data-sort-value="0.99" | 990 m || 
|-id=092 bgcolor=#fefefe
| 313092 ||  || — || October 25, 2000 || Socorro || LINEAR || — || align=right | 1.2 km || 
|-id=093 bgcolor=#d6d6d6
| 313093 ||  || — || October 25, 2000 || Socorro || LINEAR || — || align=right | 4.3 km || 
|-id=094 bgcolor=#d6d6d6
| 313094 ||  || — || October 25, 2000 || Socorro || LINEAR || — || align=right | 3.3 km || 
|-id=095 bgcolor=#fefefe
| 313095 ||  || — || November 1, 2000 || Socorro || LINEAR || H || align=right data-sort-value="0.80" | 800 m || 
|-id=096 bgcolor=#fefefe
| 313096 ||  || — || November 1, 2000 || Socorro || LINEAR || — || align=right | 1.0 km || 
|-id=097 bgcolor=#fefefe
| 313097 ||  || — || November 1, 2000 || Socorro || LINEAR || FLO || align=right data-sort-value="0.83" | 830 m || 
|-id=098 bgcolor=#fefefe
| 313098 ||  || — || November 1, 2000 || Socorro || LINEAR || — || align=right | 1.1 km || 
|-id=099 bgcolor=#fefefe
| 313099 ||  || — || November 21, 2000 || Socorro || LINEAR || H || align=right data-sort-value="0.63" | 630 m || 
|-id=100 bgcolor=#d6d6d6
| 313100 ||  || — || November 21, 2000 || Socorro || LINEAR || — || align=right | 2.9 km || 
|}

313101–313200 

|-bgcolor=#d6d6d6
| 313101 ||  || — || November 19, 2000 || Socorro || LINEAR || — || align=right | 2.8 km || 
|-id=102 bgcolor=#fefefe
| 313102 ||  || — || November 19, 2000 || Socorro || LINEAR || — || align=right data-sort-value="0.97" | 970 m || 
|-id=103 bgcolor=#fefefe
| 313103 ||  || — || November 20, 2000 || Socorro || LINEAR || NYS || align=right data-sort-value="0.84" | 840 m || 
|-id=104 bgcolor=#fefefe
| 313104 ||  || — || November 20, 2000 || Socorro || LINEAR || NYS || align=right data-sort-value="0.71" | 710 m || 
|-id=105 bgcolor=#fefefe
| 313105 ||  || — || November 21, 2000 || Socorro || LINEAR || — || align=right | 1.1 km || 
|-id=106 bgcolor=#fefefe
| 313106 ||  || — || November 21, 2000 || Socorro || LINEAR || — || align=right | 1.2 km || 
|-id=107 bgcolor=#fefefe
| 313107 ||  || — || November 29, 2000 || Socorro || LINEAR || H || align=right data-sort-value="0.80" | 800 m || 
|-id=108 bgcolor=#fefefe
| 313108 ||  || — || November 29, 2000 || Socorro || LINEAR || — || align=right | 1.1 km || 
|-id=109 bgcolor=#d6d6d6
| 313109 ||  || — || November 26, 2000 || Kitt Peak || Spacewatch || — || align=right | 3.8 km || 
|-id=110 bgcolor=#d6d6d6
| 313110 ||  || — || December 1, 2000 || Socorro || LINEAR || — || align=right | 4.6 km || 
|-id=111 bgcolor=#fefefe
| 313111 ||  || — || December 1, 2000 || Socorro || LINEAR || PHO || align=right | 1.8 km || 
|-id=112 bgcolor=#FA8072
| 313112 ||  || — || December 5, 2000 || Socorro || LINEAR || H || align=right data-sort-value="0.99" | 990 m || 
|-id=113 bgcolor=#fefefe
| 313113 ||  || — || December 6, 2000 || Bohyunsan || Y.-B. Jeon, B.-C. Lee || — || align=right data-sort-value="0.83" | 830 m || 
|-id=114 bgcolor=#fefefe
| 313114 ||  || — || December 22, 2000 || Anderson Mesa || LONEOS || — || align=right | 1.0 km || 
|-id=115 bgcolor=#d6d6d6
| 313115 ||  || — || December 28, 2000 || Fountain Hills || C. W. Juels || — || align=right | 3.6 km || 
|-id=116 bgcolor=#fefefe
| 313116 Pálvenetianer ||  ||  || December 31, 2000 || Piszkéstető || K. Sárneczky, L. Kiss || MAS || align=right data-sort-value="0.73" | 730 m || 
|-id=117 bgcolor=#fefefe
| 313117 ||  || — || December 30, 2000 || Socorro || LINEAR || ERI || align=right | 1.8 km || 
|-id=118 bgcolor=#d6d6d6
| 313118 ||  || — || December 30, 2000 || Socorro || LINEAR || — || align=right | 5.0 km || 
|-id=119 bgcolor=#d6d6d6
| 313119 ||  || — || December 30, 2000 || Socorro || LINEAR || — || align=right | 6.6 km || 
|-id=120 bgcolor=#fefefe
| 313120 ||  || — || December 28, 2000 || Kitt Peak || Spacewatch || — || align=right data-sort-value="0.83" | 830 m || 
|-id=121 bgcolor=#d6d6d6
| 313121 ||  || — || December 28, 2000 || Kitt Peak || Spacewatch || — || align=right | 4.1 km || 
|-id=122 bgcolor=#fefefe
| 313122 ||  || — || December 29, 2000 || Fair Oaks Ranch || J. V. McClusky || H || align=right data-sort-value="0.93" | 930 m || 
|-id=123 bgcolor=#fefefe
| 313123 ||  || — || January 2, 2001 || Socorro || LINEAR || H || align=right data-sort-value="0.98" | 980 m || 
|-id=124 bgcolor=#fefefe
| 313124 ||  || — || January 2, 2001 || Socorro || LINEAR || H || align=right data-sort-value="0.79" | 790 m || 
|-id=125 bgcolor=#fefefe
| 313125 ||  || — || January 2, 2001 || Socorro || LINEAR || — || align=right | 1.3 km || 
|-id=126 bgcolor=#fefefe
| 313126 ||  || — || January 15, 2001 || Socorro || LINEAR || PHO || align=right | 1.7 km || 
|-id=127 bgcolor=#fefefe
| 313127 ||  || — || January 15, 2001 || Socorro || LINEAR || PHO || align=right | 1.5 km || 
|-id=128 bgcolor=#fefefe
| 313128 ||  || — || January 16, 2001 || Haleakala || NEAT || H || align=right data-sort-value="0.78" | 780 m || 
|-id=129 bgcolor=#fefefe
| 313129 ||  || — || January 18, 2001 || Kitt Peak || Spacewatch || — || align=right | 2.0 km || 
|-id=130 bgcolor=#d6d6d6
| 313130 ||  || — || January 18, 2001 || Socorro || LINEAR || — || align=right | 3.6 km || 
|-id=131 bgcolor=#d6d6d6
| 313131 ||  || — || January 19, 2001 || Socorro || LINEAR || — || align=right | 5.2 km || 
|-id=132 bgcolor=#fefefe
| 313132 ||  || — || January 19, 2001 || Socorro || LINEAR || — || align=right | 1.4 km || 
|-id=133 bgcolor=#fefefe
| 313133 ||  || — || January 30, 2001 || Socorro || LINEAR || PHO || align=right | 1.6 km || 
|-id=134 bgcolor=#d6d6d6
| 313134 ||  || — || January 18, 2001 || Socorro || LINEAR || — || align=right | 4.0 km || 
|-id=135 bgcolor=#fefefe
| 313135 ||  || — || February 1, 2001 || Socorro || LINEAR || MAS || align=right | 1.1 km || 
|-id=136 bgcolor=#fefefe
| 313136 ||  || — || February 2, 2001 || Socorro || LINEAR || H || align=right data-sort-value="0.77" | 770 m || 
|-id=137 bgcolor=#d6d6d6
| 313137 ||  || — || February 1, 2001 || Socorro || LINEAR || TIR || align=right | 4.3 km || 
|-id=138 bgcolor=#d6d6d6
| 313138 ||  || — || February 2, 2001 || Socorro || LINEAR || — || align=right | 5.6 km || 
|-id=139 bgcolor=#d6d6d6
| 313139 ||  || — || February 1, 2001 || Socorro || LINEAR || — || align=right | 3.1 km || 
|-id=140 bgcolor=#d6d6d6
| 313140 ||  || — || February 2, 2001 || Anderson Mesa || LONEOS || — || align=right | 4.1 km || 
|-id=141 bgcolor=#d6d6d6
| 313141 ||  || — || February 12, 2001 || Oaxaca || J. M. Roe || — || align=right | 3.6 km || 
|-id=142 bgcolor=#C2FFFF
| 313142 ||  || — || February 16, 2001 || Kitt Peak || Spacewatch || L4 || align=right | 11 km || 
|-id=143 bgcolor=#d6d6d6
| 313143 ||  || — || February 16, 2001 || Socorro || LINEAR || — || align=right | 4.9 km || 
|-id=144 bgcolor=#fefefe
| 313144 ||  || — || February 16, 2001 || Kitt Peak || Spacewatch || V || align=right data-sort-value="0.81" | 810 m || 
|-id=145 bgcolor=#fefefe
| 313145 ||  || — || February 17, 2001 || Socorro || LINEAR || H || align=right data-sort-value="0.92" | 920 m || 
|-id=146 bgcolor=#fefefe
| 313146 ||  || — || February 19, 2001 || Oizumi || T. Kobayashi || H || align=right | 1.2 km || 
|-id=147 bgcolor=#d6d6d6
| 313147 ||  || — || February 2, 2001 || Socorro || LINEAR || — || align=right | 4.4 km || 
|-id=148 bgcolor=#d6d6d6
| 313148 ||  || — || February 16, 2001 || Desert Beaver || W. K. Y. Yeung || — || align=right | 5.0 km || 
|-id=149 bgcolor=#d6d6d6
| 313149 ||  || — || February 16, 2001 || Socorro || LINEAR || — || align=right | 4.7 km || 
|-id=150 bgcolor=#fefefe
| 313150 ||  || — || February 16, 2001 || Socorro || LINEAR || H || align=right | 1.1 km || 
|-id=151 bgcolor=#fefefe
| 313151 ||  || — || February 19, 2001 || Socorro || LINEAR || MAS || align=right | 1.1 km || 
|-id=152 bgcolor=#d6d6d6
| 313152 ||  || — || February 16, 2001 || Kitt Peak || Spacewatch || — || align=right | 3.8 km || 
|-id=153 bgcolor=#fefefe
| 313153 ||  || — || February 16, 2001 || Kitt Peak || Spacewatch || NYS || align=right data-sort-value="0.68" | 680 m || 
|-id=154 bgcolor=#d6d6d6
| 313154 ||  || — || February 21, 2001 || Socorro || LINEAR || — || align=right | 6.4 km || 
|-id=155 bgcolor=#d6d6d6
| 313155 ||  || — || February 19, 2001 || Socorro || LINEAR || — || align=right | 5.4 km || 
|-id=156 bgcolor=#d6d6d6
| 313156 ||  || — || February 19, 2001 || Socorro || LINEAR || — || align=right | 3.6 km || 
|-id=157 bgcolor=#d6d6d6
| 313157 ||  || — || February 19, 2001 || Socorro || LINEAR || EUP || align=right | 4.5 km || 
|-id=158 bgcolor=#d6d6d6
| 313158 ||  || — || February 22, 2001 || Kitt Peak || Spacewatch || — || align=right | 3.3 km || 
|-id=159 bgcolor=#fefefe
| 313159 ||  || — || February 16, 2001 || Socorro || LINEAR || — || align=right | 1.1 km || 
|-id=160 bgcolor=#d6d6d6
| 313160 ||  || — || February 16, 2001 || Socorro || LINEAR || — || align=right | 4.0 km || 
|-id=161 bgcolor=#d6d6d6
| 313161 ||  || — || March 14, 2001 || Socorro || LINEAR || EUP || align=right | 5.5 km || 
|-id=162 bgcolor=#fefefe
| 313162 ||  || — || March 16, 2001 || Socorro || LINEAR || — || align=right | 1.4 km || 
|-id=163 bgcolor=#d6d6d6
| 313163 ||  || — || March 19, 2001 || Anderson Mesa || LONEOS || — || align=right | 4.0 km || 
|-id=164 bgcolor=#d6d6d6
| 313164 ||  || — || March 19, 2001 || Socorro || LINEAR || EUP || align=right | 4.6 km || 
|-id=165 bgcolor=#fefefe
| 313165 ||  || — || March 19, 2001 || Socorro || LINEAR || ERI || align=right | 1.6 km || 
|-id=166 bgcolor=#d6d6d6
| 313166 ||  || — || March 19, 2001 || Socorro || LINEAR || — || align=right | 4.9 km || 
|-id=167 bgcolor=#fefefe
| 313167 ||  || — || March 26, 2001 || Kitt Peak || Spacewatch || — || align=right data-sort-value="0.80" | 800 m || 
|-id=168 bgcolor=#fefefe
| 313168 ||  || — || March 21, 2001 || Anderson Mesa || LONEOS || — || align=right | 3.3 km || 
|-id=169 bgcolor=#d6d6d6
| 313169 ||  || — || March 24, 2001 || Haleakala || NEAT || Tj (2.98) || align=right | 5.9 km || 
|-id=170 bgcolor=#d6d6d6
| 313170 ||  || — || March 19, 2001 || Anderson Mesa || LONEOS || — || align=right | 5.1 km || 
|-id=171 bgcolor=#d6d6d6
| 313171 ||  || — || April 27, 2001 || Socorro || LINEAR || EUP || align=right | 4.5 km || 
|-id=172 bgcolor=#fefefe
| 313172 ||  || — || May 17, 2001 || Socorro || LINEAR || — || align=right | 1.5 km || 
|-id=173 bgcolor=#E9E9E9
| 313173 ||  || — || June 20, 2001 || Palomar || NEAT || EUN || align=right | 2.0 km || 
|-id=174 bgcolor=#E9E9E9
| 313174 ||  || — || June 21, 2001 || Palomar || NEAT || KON || align=right | 3.0 km || 
|-id=175 bgcolor=#E9E9E9
| 313175 ||  || — || June 28, 2001 || Anderson Mesa || LONEOS || — || align=right | 1.5 km || 
|-id=176 bgcolor=#E9E9E9
| 313176 ||  || — || June 29, 2001 || Haleakala || NEAT || EUN || align=right | 1.6 km || 
|-id=177 bgcolor=#E9E9E9
| 313177 ||  || — || July 19, 2001 || Reedy Creek || J. Broughton || — || align=right | 1.8 km || 
|-id=178 bgcolor=#E9E9E9
| 313178 ||  || — || July 23, 2001 || Palomar || NEAT || — || align=right | 1.9 km || 
|-id=179 bgcolor=#E9E9E9
| 313179 ||  || — || July 23, 2001 || Palomar || NEAT || — || align=right | 3.2 km || 
|-id=180 bgcolor=#E9E9E9
| 313180 ||  || — || July 17, 2001 || Haleakala || NEAT || — || align=right | 1.4 km || 
|-id=181 bgcolor=#FA8072
| 313181 ||  || — || July 26, 2001 || Palomar || NEAT || — || align=right data-sort-value="0.75" | 750 m || 
|-id=182 bgcolor=#E9E9E9
| 313182 ||  || — || July 28, 2001 || Haleakala || NEAT || — || align=right | 1.6 km || 
|-id=183 bgcolor=#E9E9E9
| 313183 ||  || — || July 30, 2001 || Socorro || LINEAR || — || align=right | 1.6 km || 
|-id=184 bgcolor=#E9E9E9
| 313184 ||  || — || August 10, 2001 || Haleakala || NEAT || — || align=right | 2.1 km || 
|-id=185 bgcolor=#E9E9E9
| 313185 ||  || — || August 11, 2001 || Haleakala || NEAT || — || align=right | 1.3 km || 
|-id=186 bgcolor=#E9E9E9
| 313186 ||  || — || August 10, 2001 || Palomar || NEAT || — || align=right | 1.5 km || 
|-id=187 bgcolor=#E9E9E9
| 313187 ||  || — || August 17, 2001 || Reedy Creek || J. Broughton || — || align=right | 2.2 km || 
|-id=188 bgcolor=#E9E9E9
| 313188 ||  || — || August 16, 2001 || Socorro || LINEAR || EUN || align=right | 1.8 km || 
|-id=189 bgcolor=#E9E9E9
| 313189 ||  || — || August 19, 2001 || Socorro || LINEAR || — || align=right | 2.0 km || 
|-id=190 bgcolor=#E9E9E9
| 313190 ||  || — || August 19, 2001 || Socorro || LINEAR || — || align=right | 2.9 km || 
|-id=191 bgcolor=#E9E9E9
| 313191 ||  || — || August 19, 2001 || Socorro || LINEAR || — || align=right | 1.9 km || 
|-id=192 bgcolor=#E9E9E9
| 313192 ||  || — || August 25, 2001 || Ondřejov || P. Kušnirák, P. Pravec || — || align=right | 2.2 km || 
|-id=193 bgcolor=#E9E9E9
| 313193 ||  || — || August 17, 2001 || Socorro || LINEAR || — || align=right | 3.1 km || 
|-id=194 bgcolor=#E9E9E9
| 313194 ||  || — || August 17, 2001 || Socorro || LINEAR || MAR || align=right | 1.7 km || 
|-id=195 bgcolor=#E9E9E9
| 313195 ||  || — || August 23, 2001 || Anderson Mesa || LONEOS || POS || align=right | 3.2 km || 
|-id=196 bgcolor=#E9E9E9
| 313196 ||  || — || August 25, 2001 || Socorro || LINEAR || — || align=right | 2.1 km || 
|-id=197 bgcolor=#E9E9E9
| 313197 ||  || — || August 21, 2001 || Haleakala || NEAT || 526 || align=right | 3.8 km || 
|-id=198 bgcolor=#E9E9E9
| 313198 ||  || — || August 23, 2001 || Anderson Mesa || LONEOS || — || align=right | 2.4 km || 
|-id=199 bgcolor=#E9E9E9
| 313199 ||  || — || August 23, 2001 || Anderson Mesa || LONEOS || GEF || align=right | 1.5 km || 
|-id=200 bgcolor=#E9E9E9
| 313200 ||  || — || August 23, 2001 || Anderson Mesa || LONEOS || EUN || align=right | 1.3 km || 
|}

313201–313300 

|-bgcolor=#E9E9E9
| 313201 ||  || — || August 24, 2001 || Anderson Mesa || LONEOS || — || align=right | 1.4 km || 
|-id=202 bgcolor=#E9E9E9
| 313202 || 2001 RV || — || September 7, 2001 || Goodricke-Pigott || R. A. Tucker || ADE || align=right | 3.0 km || 
|-id=203 bgcolor=#E9E9E9
| 313203 ||  || — || September 10, 2001 || Desert Eagle || W. K. Y. Yeung || — || align=right | 2.5 km || 
|-id=204 bgcolor=#E9E9E9
| 313204 ||  || — || September 10, 2001 || Socorro || LINEAR || — || align=right | 2.7 km || 
|-id=205 bgcolor=#E9E9E9
| 313205 ||  || — || September 11, 2001 || Socorro || LINEAR || — || align=right | 2.1 km || 
|-id=206 bgcolor=#d6d6d6
| 313206 ||  || — || September 12, 2001 || Socorro || LINEAR || 3:2 || align=right | 5.0 km || 
|-id=207 bgcolor=#E9E9E9
| 313207 ||  || — || September 11, 2001 || Anderson Mesa || LONEOS || — || align=right | 2.2 km || 
|-id=208 bgcolor=#E9E9E9
| 313208 ||  || — || September 12, 2001 || Kitt Peak || Spacewatch || MAR || align=right | 1.4 km || 
|-id=209 bgcolor=#E9E9E9
| 313209 ||  || — || September 11, 2001 || Anderson Mesa || LONEOS || — || align=right | 2.9 km || 
|-id=210 bgcolor=#fefefe
| 313210 ||  || — || September 17, 2001 || Desert Eagle || W. K. Y. Yeung || — || align=right data-sort-value="0.90" | 900 m || 
|-id=211 bgcolor=#E9E9E9
| 313211 ||  || — || September 16, 2001 || Socorro || LINEAR || — || align=right | 2.6 km || 
|-id=212 bgcolor=#E9E9E9
| 313212 ||  || — || September 20, 2001 || Socorro || LINEAR || AER || align=right | 2.6 km || 
|-id=213 bgcolor=#E9E9E9
| 313213 ||  || — || September 16, 2001 || Socorro || LINEAR || NEM || align=right | 2.2 km || 
|-id=214 bgcolor=#E9E9E9
| 313214 ||  || — || September 16, 2001 || Socorro || LINEAR || — || align=right | 2.5 km || 
|-id=215 bgcolor=#d6d6d6
| 313215 ||  || — || September 19, 2001 || Socorro || LINEAR || 3:2 || align=right | 4.6 km || 
|-id=216 bgcolor=#E9E9E9
| 313216 ||  || — || September 19, 2001 || Socorro || LINEAR || HNA || align=right | 2.2 km || 
|-id=217 bgcolor=#E9E9E9
| 313217 ||  || — || September 19, 2001 || Socorro || LINEAR || — || align=right | 2.7 km || 
|-id=218 bgcolor=#E9E9E9
| 313218 ||  || — || September 19, 2001 || Socorro || LINEAR || — || align=right | 2.9 km || 
|-id=219 bgcolor=#E9E9E9
| 313219 ||  || — || September 20, 2001 || Socorro || LINEAR || — || align=right | 2.1 km || 
|-id=220 bgcolor=#d6d6d6
| 313220 ||  || — || September 22, 2001 || Kitt Peak || Spacewatch || 3:2 || align=right | 4.5 km || 
|-id=221 bgcolor=#E9E9E9
| 313221 ||  || — || September 20, 2001 || Socorro || LINEAR || — || align=right | 1.8 km || 
|-id=222 bgcolor=#E9E9E9
| 313222 ||  || — || September 20, 2001 || Socorro || LINEAR || NEM || align=right | 2.4 km || 
|-id=223 bgcolor=#E9E9E9
| 313223 ||  || — || September 21, 2001 || Palomar || NEAT || MAR || align=right | 1.4 km || 
|-id=224 bgcolor=#E9E9E9
| 313224 ||  || — || August 17, 2001 || Socorro || LINEAR || GEF || align=right | 1.3 km || 
|-id=225 bgcolor=#E9E9E9
| 313225 ||  || — || October 13, 2001 || Socorro || LINEAR || — || align=right | 3.6 km || 
|-id=226 bgcolor=#E9E9E9
| 313226 ||  || — || October 14, 2001 || Socorro || LINEAR || — || align=right | 2.7 km || 
|-id=227 bgcolor=#E9E9E9
| 313227 ||  || — || October 14, 2001 || Socorro || LINEAR || — || align=right | 3.0 km || 
|-id=228 bgcolor=#E9E9E9
| 313228 ||  || — || October 15, 2001 || Socorro || LINEAR || — || align=right | 3.2 km || 
|-id=229 bgcolor=#fefefe
| 313229 ||  || — || October 10, 2001 || Palomar || NEAT || FLO || align=right data-sort-value="0.67" | 670 m || 
|-id=230 bgcolor=#E9E9E9
| 313230 ||  || — || October 14, 2001 || Socorro || LINEAR || — || align=right | 3.1 km || 
|-id=231 bgcolor=#E9E9E9
| 313231 ||  || — || October 11, 2001 || Socorro || LINEAR || INO || align=right | 2.0 km || 
|-id=232 bgcolor=#E9E9E9
| 313232 ||  || — || October 13, 2001 || Palomar || NEAT || — || align=right | 2.4 km || 
|-id=233 bgcolor=#E9E9E9
| 313233 ||  || — || October 15, 2001 || Palomar || NEAT || — || align=right | 2.5 km || 
|-id=234 bgcolor=#fefefe
| 313234 ||  || — || October 15, 2001 || Kitt Peak || Spacewatch || — || align=right data-sort-value="0.90" | 900 m || 
|-id=235 bgcolor=#E9E9E9
| 313235 ||  || — || October 14, 2001 || Apache Point || SDSS || NEM || align=right | 1.9 km || 
|-id=236 bgcolor=#E9E9E9
| 313236 ||  || — || October 10, 2001 || Palomar || NEAT || NEM || align=right | 2.1 km || 
|-id=237 bgcolor=#E9E9E9
| 313237 ||  || — || October 14, 2001 || Apache Point || SDSS || — || align=right | 2.1 km || 
|-id=238 bgcolor=#E9E9E9
| 313238 ||  || — || October 17, 2001 || Socorro || LINEAR || — || align=right | 2.9 km || 
|-id=239 bgcolor=#E9E9E9
| 313239 ||  || — || October 16, 2001 || Socorro || LINEAR || — || align=right | 3.3 km || 
|-id=240 bgcolor=#E9E9E9
| 313240 ||  || — || October 17, 2001 || Socorro || LINEAR || — || align=right | 1.9 km || 
|-id=241 bgcolor=#E9E9E9
| 313241 ||  || — || October 17, 2001 || Socorro || LINEAR || INO || align=right | 1.9 km || 
|-id=242 bgcolor=#fefefe
| 313242 ||  || — || October 20, 2001 || Socorro || LINEAR || — || align=right data-sort-value="0.76" | 760 m || 
|-id=243 bgcolor=#E9E9E9
| 313243 ||  || — || October 16, 2001 || Socorro || LINEAR || DOR || align=right | 2.7 km || 
|-id=244 bgcolor=#E9E9E9
| 313244 ||  || — || October 16, 2001 || Palomar || NEAT || DOR || align=right | 2.9 km || 
|-id=245 bgcolor=#E9E9E9
| 313245 ||  || — || October 17, 2001 || Socorro || LINEAR || DOR || align=right | 2.2 km || 
|-id=246 bgcolor=#E9E9E9
| 313246 ||  || — || October 15, 2001 || Kitt Peak || Spacewatch || — || align=right | 2.3 km || 
|-id=247 bgcolor=#E9E9E9
| 313247 ||  || — || October 23, 2001 || Socorro || LINEAR || — || align=right | 2.1 km || 
|-id=248 bgcolor=#E9E9E9
| 313248 ||  || — || October 23, 2001 || Socorro || LINEAR || — || align=right | 2.9 km || 
|-id=249 bgcolor=#E9E9E9
| 313249 ||  || — || October 19, 2001 || Palomar || NEAT || — || align=right | 1.9 km || 
|-id=250 bgcolor=#E9E9E9
| 313250 ||  || — || October 19, 2001 || Palomar || NEAT || — || align=right | 2.2 km || 
|-id=251 bgcolor=#E9E9E9
| 313251 ||  || — || October 26, 2001 || Palomar || NEAT || — || align=right | 2.7 km || 
|-id=252 bgcolor=#fefefe
| 313252 ||  || — || November 9, 2001 || Socorro || LINEAR || — || align=right | 1.1 km || 
|-id=253 bgcolor=#fefefe
| 313253 ||  || — || November 12, 2001 || Socorro || LINEAR || — || align=right data-sort-value="0.71" | 710 m || 
|-id=254 bgcolor=#fefefe
| 313254 ||  || — || November 12, 2001 || Socorro || LINEAR || — || align=right data-sort-value="0.89" | 890 m || 
|-id=255 bgcolor=#d6d6d6
| 313255 ||  || — || November 12, 2001 || Socorro || LINEAR || — || align=right | 2.7 km || 
|-id=256 bgcolor=#E9E9E9
| 313256 ||  || — || November 11, 2001 || Apache Point || SDSS || — || align=right | 2.5 km || 
|-id=257 bgcolor=#E9E9E9
| 313257 ||  || — || November 11, 2001 || Apache Point || SDSS || WIT || align=right data-sort-value="0.99" | 990 m || 
|-id=258 bgcolor=#fefefe
| 313258 ||  || — || November 17, 2001 || Socorro || LINEAR || — || align=right data-sort-value="0.72" | 720 m || 
|-id=259 bgcolor=#E9E9E9
| 313259 ||  || — || November 19, 2001 || Socorro || LINEAR || — || align=right | 2.4 km || 
|-id=260 bgcolor=#fefefe
| 313260 ||  || — || November 21, 2001 || Socorro || LINEAR || — || align=right data-sort-value="0.85" | 850 m || 
|-id=261 bgcolor=#E9E9E9
| 313261 ||  || — || December 9, 2001 || Socorro || LINEAR || DOR || align=right | 3.2 km || 
|-id=262 bgcolor=#fefefe
| 313262 ||  || — || December 10, 2001 || Kitt Peak || Spacewatch || — || align=right | 1.3 km || 
|-id=263 bgcolor=#E9E9E9
| 313263 ||  || — || December 11, 2001 || Socorro || LINEAR || GEF || align=right | 1.9 km || 
|-id=264 bgcolor=#fefefe
| 313264 ||  || — || December 14, 2001 || Socorro || LINEAR || — || align=right data-sort-value="0.99" | 990 m || 
|-id=265 bgcolor=#E9E9E9
| 313265 ||  || — || December 14, 2001 || Socorro || LINEAR || — || align=right | 2.9 km || 
|-id=266 bgcolor=#fefefe
| 313266 ||  || — || December 14, 2001 || Socorro || LINEAR || — || align=right data-sort-value="0.79" | 790 m || 
|-id=267 bgcolor=#E9E9E9
| 313267 ||  || — || December 15, 2001 || Socorro || LINEAR || WAT || align=right | 3.1 km || 
|-id=268 bgcolor=#fefefe
| 313268 ||  || — || December 15, 2001 || Socorro || LINEAR || FLO || align=right data-sort-value="0.74" | 740 m || 
|-id=269 bgcolor=#d6d6d6
| 313269 ||  || — || December 17, 2001 || Palomar || NEAT || — || align=right | 4.0 km || 
|-id=270 bgcolor=#fefefe
| 313270 ||  || — || December 17, 2001 || Socorro || LINEAR || — || align=right data-sort-value="0.94" | 940 m || 
|-id=271 bgcolor=#fefefe
| 313271 ||  || — || December 18, 2001 || Socorro || LINEAR || — || align=right data-sort-value="0.88" | 880 m || 
|-id=272 bgcolor=#d6d6d6
| 313272 ||  || — || December 18, 2001 || Socorro || LINEAR || — || align=right | 5.1 km || 
|-id=273 bgcolor=#d6d6d6
| 313273 ||  || — || December 17, 2001 || Palomar || NEAT || EOS || align=right | 2.6 km || 
|-id=274 bgcolor=#d6d6d6
| 313274 ||  || — || December 19, 2001 || Palomar || NEAT || — || align=right | 3.9 km || 
|-id=275 bgcolor=#d6d6d6
| 313275 ||  || — || January 15, 2007 || Catalina || CSS || — || align=right | 3.3 km || 
|-id=276 bgcolor=#FFC2E0
| 313276 ||  || — || January 6, 2002 || Socorro || LINEAR || ATE || align=right data-sort-value="0.40" | 400 m || 
|-id=277 bgcolor=#d6d6d6
| 313277 ||  || — || January 8, 2002 || Palomar || NEAT || — || align=right | 3.8 km || 
|-id=278 bgcolor=#d6d6d6
| 313278 ||  || — || January 12, 2002 || Kitt Peak || Spacewatch || — || align=right | 4.6 km || 
|-id=279 bgcolor=#fefefe
| 313279 ||  || — || January 9, 2002 || Socorro || LINEAR || FLO || align=right data-sort-value="0.78" | 780 m || 
|-id=280 bgcolor=#fefefe
| 313280 ||  || — || January 9, 2002 || Socorro || LINEAR || FLO || align=right data-sort-value="0.84" | 840 m || 
|-id=281 bgcolor=#d6d6d6
| 313281 ||  || — || January 14, 2002 || Socorro || LINEAR || TRP || align=right | 2.6 km || 
|-id=282 bgcolor=#d6d6d6
| 313282 ||  || — || January 12, 2002 || Kitt Peak || Spacewatch || — || align=right | 1.6 km || 
|-id=283 bgcolor=#E9E9E9
| 313283 ||  || — || January 13, 2002 || Apache Point || SDSS || — || align=right | 3.8 km || 
|-id=284 bgcolor=#fefefe
| 313284 ||  || — || February 7, 2002 || Socorro || LINEAR || — || align=right | 1.1 km || 
|-id=285 bgcolor=#fefefe
| 313285 ||  || — || February 4, 2002 || Palomar || NEAT || FLO || align=right data-sort-value="0.76" | 760 m || 
|-id=286 bgcolor=#d6d6d6
| 313286 ||  || — || February 6, 2002 || Socorro || LINEAR || — || align=right | 3.8 km || 
|-id=287 bgcolor=#d6d6d6
| 313287 ||  || — || February 6, 2002 || Socorro || LINEAR || — || align=right | 3.5 km || 
|-id=288 bgcolor=#d6d6d6
| 313288 ||  || — || February 6, 2002 || Socorro || LINEAR || — || align=right | 2.7 km || 
|-id=289 bgcolor=#fefefe
| 313289 ||  || — || February 7, 2002 || Socorro || LINEAR || — || align=right data-sort-value="0.74" | 740 m || 
|-id=290 bgcolor=#fefefe
| 313290 ||  || — || February 7, 2002 || Socorro || LINEAR || FLO || align=right data-sort-value="0.87" | 870 m || 
|-id=291 bgcolor=#FA8072
| 313291 ||  || — || February 14, 2002 || Haleakala || NEAT || H || align=right data-sort-value="0.80" | 800 m || 
|-id=292 bgcolor=#fefefe
| 313292 ||  || — || February 7, 2002 || Socorro || LINEAR || — || align=right data-sort-value="0.93" | 930 m || 
|-id=293 bgcolor=#d6d6d6
| 313293 ||  || — || February 7, 2002 || Socorro || LINEAR || — || align=right | 3.7 km || 
|-id=294 bgcolor=#d6d6d6
| 313294 ||  || — || February 8, 2002 || Socorro || LINEAR || — || align=right | 3.9 km || 
|-id=295 bgcolor=#fefefe
| 313295 ||  || — || February 10, 2002 || Socorro || LINEAR || — || align=right data-sort-value="0.69" | 690 m || 
|-id=296 bgcolor=#d6d6d6
| 313296 ||  || — || February 8, 2002 || Socorro || LINEAR || — || align=right | 3.7 km || 
|-id=297 bgcolor=#d6d6d6
| 313297 ||  || — || February 10, 2002 || Socorro || LINEAR || NAE || align=right | 3.6 km || 
|-id=298 bgcolor=#d6d6d6
| 313298 ||  || — || February 10, 2002 || Socorro || LINEAR || EOS || align=right | 4.4 km || 
|-id=299 bgcolor=#fefefe
| 313299 ||  || — || February 10, 2002 || Socorro || LINEAR || — || align=right data-sort-value="0.71" | 710 m || 
|-id=300 bgcolor=#d6d6d6
| 313300 ||  || — || February 10, 2002 || Socorro || LINEAR || — || align=right | 3.7 km || 
|}

313301–313400 

|-bgcolor=#d6d6d6
| 313301 ||  || — || February 14, 2002 || Haleakala || NEAT || — || align=right | 4.8 km || 
|-id=302 bgcolor=#d6d6d6
| 313302 ||  || — || February 4, 2002 || Palomar || NEAT || EOS || align=right | 2.4 km || 
|-id=303 bgcolor=#C2FFFF
| 313303 ||  || — || February 7, 2002 || Kitt Peak || Spacewatch || L4 || align=right | 13 km || 
|-id=304 bgcolor=#fefefe
| 313304 ||  || — || February 10, 2002 || Socorro || LINEAR || FLO || align=right | 1.0 km || 
|-id=305 bgcolor=#fefefe
| 313305 ||  || — || February 3, 2002 || Palomar || NEAT || — || align=right data-sort-value="0.98" | 980 m || 
|-id=306 bgcolor=#d6d6d6
| 313306 ||  || — || February 7, 2002 || Socorro || LINEAR || ALA || align=right | 4.6 km || 
|-id=307 bgcolor=#fefefe
| 313307 ||  || — || February 7, 2002 || Palomar || NEAT || — || align=right data-sort-value="0.79" | 790 m || 
|-id=308 bgcolor=#fefefe
| 313308 ||  || — || February 20, 2002 || Socorro || LINEAR || V || align=right data-sort-value="0.82" | 820 m || 
|-id=309 bgcolor=#FA8072
| 313309 ||  || — || March 12, 2002 || Kitt Peak || Spacewatch || — || align=right data-sort-value="0.90" | 900 m || 
|-id=310 bgcolor=#fefefe
| 313310 ||  || — || March 14, 2002 || Socorro || LINEAR || — || align=right | 2.1 km || 
|-id=311 bgcolor=#d6d6d6
| 313311 ||  || — || March 10, 2002 || Palomar || NEAT || — || align=right | 3.6 km || 
|-id=312 bgcolor=#fefefe
| 313312 ||  || — || March 12, 2002 || Kitt Peak || Spacewatch || — || align=right data-sort-value="0.67" | 670 m || 
|-id=313 bgcolor=#fefefe
| 313313 ||  || — || March 9, 2002 || Socorro || LINEAR || — || align=right data-sort-value="0.66" | 660 m || 
|-id=314 bgcolor=#d6d6d6
| 313314 ||  || — || March 12, 2002 || Socorro || LINEAR || — || align=right | 4.0 km || 
|-id=315 bgcolor=#fefefe
| 313315 ||  || — || March 12, 2002 || Palomar || NEAT || — || align=right data-sort-value="0.69" | 690 m || 
|-id=316 bgcolor=#d6d6d6
| 313316 ||  || — || March 13, 2002 || Socorro || LINEAR || — || align=right | 3.0 km || 
|-id=317 bgcolor=#fefefe
| 313317 ||  || — || March 13, 2002 || Socorro || LINEAR || — || align=right | 1.0 km || 
|-id=318 bgcolor=#fefefe
| 313318 ||  || — || March 13, 2002 || Socorro || LINEAR || FLO || align=right data-sort-value="0.69" | 690 m || 
|-id=319 bgcolor=#d6d6d6
| 313319 ||  || — || March 13, 2002 || Palomar || NEAT || — || align=right | 3.9 km || 
|-id=320 bgcolor=#d6d6d6
| 313320 ||  || — || March 11, 2002 || Kitt Peak || Spacewatch || — || align=right | 3.4 km || 
|-id=321 bgcolor=#fefefe
| 313321 ||  || — || March 12, 2002 || Kitt Peak || Spacewatch || FLO || align=right data-sort-value="0.57" | 570 m || 
|-id=322 bgcolor=#d6d6d6
| 313322 ||  || — || March 13, 2002 || Kitt Peak || Spacewatch || — || align=right | 3.5 km || 
|-id=323 bgcolor=#C2FFFF
| 313323 ||  || — || March 15, 2002 || Palomar || NEAT || L4ERY || align=right | 10 km || 
|-id=324 bgcolor=#d6d6d6
| 313324 ||  || — || March 5, 2002 || Apache Point || SDSS || — || align=right | 1.9 km || 
|-id=325 bgcolor=#d6d6d6
| 313325 ||  || — || March 13, 2002 || Kitt Peak || Spacewatch || — || align=right | 3.3 km || 
|-id=326 bgcolor=#fefefe
| 313326 ||  || — || March 15, 2002 || Palomar || NEAT || V || align=right data-sort-value="0.58" | 580 m || 
|-id=327 bgcolor=#fefefe
| 313327 ||  || — || March 13, 2002 || Palomar || NEAT || — || align=right data-sort-value="0.91" | 910 m || 
|-id=328 bgcolor=#fefefe
| 313328 ||  || — || March 20, 2002 || Desert Eagle || W. K. Y. Yeung || — || align=right data-sort-value="0.81" | 810 m || 
|-id=329 bgcolor=#FA8072
| 313329 ||  || — || March 20, 2002 || Socorro || LINEAR || — || align=right | 1.2 km || 
|-id=330 bgcolor=#d6d6d6
| 313330 ||  || — || March 16, 2002 || Haleakala || NEAT || — || align=right | 4.1 km || 
|-id=331 bgcolor=#d6d6d6
| 313331 ||  || — || March 19, 2002 || Anderson Mesa || LONEOS || EOS || align=right | 2.7 km || 
|-id=332 bgcolor=#d6d6d6
| 313332 ||  || — || March 21, 2002 || Socorro || LINEAR || — || align=right | 4.7 km || 
|-id=333 bgcolor=#d6d6d6
| 313333 ||  || — || March 19, 2002 || Haleakala || NEAT || EOS || align=right | 2.8 km || 
|-id=334 bgcolor=#d6d6d6
| 313334 ||  || — || April 4, 2002 || Socorro || LINEAR || — || align=right | 4.2 km || 
|-id=335 bgcolor=#fefefe
| 313335 ||  || — || April 9, 2002 || Socorro || LINEAR || H || align=right data-sort-value="0.96" | 960 m || 
|-id=336 bgcolor=#fefefe
| 313336 ||  || — || April 12, 2002 || Palomar || NEAT || — || align=right | 2.4 km || 
|-id=337 bgcolor=#fefefe
| 313337 ||  || — || March 17, 2002 || Kitt Peak || Spacewatch || MAS || align=right data-sort-value="0.80" | 800 m || 
|-id=338 bgcolor=#fefefe
| 313338 ||  || — || April 2, 2002 || Kitt Peak || Spacewatch || — || align=right data-sort-value="0.96" | 960 m || 
|-id=339 bgcolor=#d6d6d6
| 313339 ||  || — || April 4, 2002 || Palomar || NEAT || — || align=right | 3.4 km || 
|-id=340 bgcolor=#d6d6d6
| 313340 ||  || — || April 4, 2002 || Palomar || NEAT || — || align=right | 3.7 km || 
|-id=341 bgcolor=#fefefe
| 313341 ||  || — || April 4, 2002 || Palomar || NEAT || — || align=right data-sort-value="0.99" | 990 m || 
|-id=342 bgcolor=#fefefe
| 313342 ||  || — || April 8, 2002 || Palomar || NEAT || EUT || align=right data-sort-value="0.65" | 650 m || 
|-id=343 bgcolor=#d6d6d6
| 313343 ||  || — || April 9, 2002 || Anderson Mesa || LONEOS || — || align=right | 5.0 km || 
|-id=344 bgcolor=#d6d6d6
| 313344 ||  || — || April 9, 2002 || Socorro || LINEAR || — || align=right | 3.2 km || 
|-id=345 bgcolor=#d6d6d6
| 313345 ||  || — || April 10, 2002 || Socorro || LINEAR || EOS || align=right | 3.1 km || 
|-id=346 bgcolor=#fefefe
| 313346 ||  || — || April 11, 2002 || Palomar || NEAT || — || align=right data-sort-value="0.83" | 830 m || 
|-id=347 bgcolor=#d6d6d6
| 313347 ||  || — || April 11, 2002 || Palomar || NEAT || — || align=right | 4.7 km || 
|-id=348 bgcolor=#d6d6d6
| 313348 ||  || — || April 10, 2002 || Socorro || LINEAR || EOS || align=right | 3.1 km || 
|-id=349 bgcolor=#d6d6d6
| 313349 ||  || — || April 12, 2002 || Palomar || NEAT || — || align=right | 4.4 km || 
|-id=350 bgcolor=#d6d6d6
| 313350 ||  || — || April 10, 2002 || Palomar || NEAT || — || align=right | 2.7 km || 
|-id=351 bgcolor=#d6d6d6
| 313351 ||  || — || April 12, 2002 || Kitt Peak || Spacewatch || — || align=right | 3.9 km || 
|-id=352 bgcolor=#fefefe
| 313352 ||  || — || April 12, 2002 || Socorro || LINEAR || V || align=right data-sort-value="0.72" | 720 m || 
|-id=353 bgcolor=#d6d6d6
| 313353 ||  || — || April 12, 2002 || Socorro || LINEAR || — || align=right | 3.9 km || 
|-id=354 bgcolor=#fefefe
| 313354 ||  || — || April 12, 2002 || Socorro || LINEAR || V || align=right data-sort-value="0.85" | 850 m || 
|-id=355 bgcolor=#d6d6d6
| 313355 ||  || — || April 12, 2002 || Socorro || LINEAR || — || align=right | 3.8 km || 
|-id=356 bgcolor=#fefefe
| 313356 ||  || — || April 12, 2002 || Socorro || LINEAR || FLO || align=right data-sort-value="0.64" | 640 m || 
|-id=357 bgcolor=#C2FFFF
| 313357 ||  || — || April 13, 2002 || Palomar || NEAT || L4 || align=right | 16 km || 
|-id=358 bgcolor=#d6d6d6
| 313358 ||  || — || April 12, 2002 || Palomar || NEAT || — || align=right | 6.2 km || 
|-id=359 bgcolor=#d6d6d6
| 313359 ||  || — || April 11, 2002 || Socorro || LINEAR || — || align=right | 2.9 km || 
|-id=360 bgcolor=#d6d6d6
| 313360 ||  || — || April 4, 2002 || Palomar || NEAT || — || align=right | 3.4 km || 
|-id=361 bgcolor=#d6d6d6
| 313361 ||  || — || April 9, 2002 || Palomar || NEAT || — || align=right | 3.5 km || 
|-id=362 bgcolor=#d6d6d6
| 313362 ||  || — || April 14, 2002 || Palomar || NEAT || — || align=right | 3.2 km || 
|-id=363 bgcolor=#fefefe
| 313363 ||  || — || December 18, 2004 || Mount Lemmon || Mount Lemmon Survey || — || align=right data-sort-value="0.94" | 940 m || 
|-id=364 bgcolor=#fefefe
| 313364 ||  || — || December 20, 2004 || Mount Lemmon || Mount Lemmon Survey || — || align=right | 1.4 km || 
|-id=365 bgcolor=#fefefe
| 313365 ||  || — || April 22, 2002 || Socorro || LINEAR || H || align=right | 1.1 km || 
|-id=366 bgcolor=#d6d6d6
| 313366 ||  || — || May 8, 2002 || Socorro || LINEAR || — || align=right | 4.4 km || 
|-id=367 bgcolor=#fefefe
| 313367 ||  || — || May 8, 2002 || Socorro || LINEAR || — || align=right | 1.3 km || 
|-id=368 bgcolor=#d6d6d6
| 313368 ||  || — || May 9, 2002 || Socorro || LINEAR || — || align=right | 4.2 km || 
|-id=369 bgcolor=#d6d6d6
| 313369 ||  || — || May 9, 2002 || Socorro || LINEAR || EUP || align=right | 7.9 km || 
|-id=370 bgcolor=#fefefe
| 313370 ||  || — || May 9, 2002 || Socorro || LINEAR || H || align=right data-sort-value="0.98" | 980 m || 
|-id=371 bgcolor=#fefefe
| 313371 ||  || — || May 8, 2002 || Socorro || LINEAR || — || align=right | 3.0 km || 
|-id=372 bgcolor=#d6d6d6
| 313372 ||  || — || May 6, 2002 || Socorro || LINEAR || — || align=right | 3.8 km || 
|-id=373 bgcolor=#d6d6d6
| 313373 ||  || — || May 5, 2002 || Palomar || NEAT || — || align=right | 4.1 km || 
|-id=374 bgcolor=#d6d6d6
| 313374 ||  || — || May 13, 2002 || Palomar || NEAT || ALA || align=right | 4.3 km || 
|-id=375 bgcolor=#d6d6d6
| 313375 ||  || — || May 14, 2002 || Palomar || NEAT || — || align=right | 5.4 km || 
|-id=376 bgcolor=#fefefe
| 313376 ||  || — || March 4, 2005 || Mount Lemmon || Mount Lemmon Survey || — || align=right data-sort-value="0.83" | 830 m || 
|-id=377 bgcolor=#fefefe
| 313377 ||  || — || May 16, 2002 || Haleakala || NEAT || — || align=right | 1.0 km || 
|-id=378 bgcolor=#fefefe
| 313378 ||  || — || May 19, 2002 || Palomar || NEAT || — || align=right data-sort-value="0.88" | 880 m || 
|-id=379 bgcolor=#fefefe
| 313379 ||  || — || December 5, 2007 || Kitt Peak || Spacewatch || — || align=right | 1.1 km || 
|-id=380 bgcolor=#fefefe
| 313380 ||  || — || June 6, 2002 || Socorro || LINEAR || FLO || align=right data-sort-value="0.95" | 950 m || 
|-id=381 bgcolor=#d6d6d6
| 313381 ||  || — || June 3, 2002 || Socorro || LINEAR || — || align=right | 4.7 km || 
|-id=382 bgcolor=#d6d6d6
| 313382 ||  || — || June 4, 2002 || Anderson Mesa || LONEOS || — || align=right | 4.9 km || 
|-id=383 bgcolor=#d6d6d6
| 313383 ||  || — || June 8, 2002 || Palomar || NEAT || — || align=right | 4.7 km || 
|-id=384 bgcolor=#fefefe
| 313384 ||  || — || June 12, 2002 || Palomar || M. Meyer || NYS || align=right data-sort-value="0.83" | 830 m || 
|-id=385 bgcolor=#d6d6d6
| 313385 ||  || — || July 9, 2002 || Socorro || LINEAR || — || align=right | 4.5 km || 
|-id=386 bgcolor=#E9E9E9
| 313386 ||  || — || July 9, 2002 || Socorro || LINEAR || — || align=right | 1.3 km || 
|-id=387 bgcolor=#fefefe
| 313387 ||  || — || July 14, 2002 || Palomar || NEAT || NYS || align=right data-sort-value="0.83" | 830 m || 
|-id=388 bgcolor=#fefefe
| 313388 ||  || — || July 5, 2002 || Palomar || NEAT || — || align=right | 3.3 km || 
|-id=389 bgcolor=#fefefe
| 313389 ||  || — || July 14, 2002 || Palomar || NEAT || — || align=right | 1.2 km || 
|-id=390 bgcolor=#E9E9E9
| 313390 ||  || — || July 5, 2002 || Palomar || NEAT || — || align=right | 1.4 km || 
|-id=391 bgcolor=#E9E9E9
| 313391 ||  || — || July 2, 2002 || Palomar || NEAT || — || align=right | 1.2 km || 
|-id=392 bgcolor=#E9E9E9
| 313392 ||  || — || July 12, 2002 || Palomar || NEAT || JUN || align=right data-sort-value="0.92" | 920 m || 
|-id=393 bgcolor=#fefefe
| 313393 ||  || — || July 9, 2002 || Palomar || NEAT || V || align=right data-sort-value="0.73" | 730 m || 
|-id=394 bgcolor=#fefefe
| 313394 ||  || — || July 5, 2002 || Palomar || NEAT || NYS || align=right data-sort-value="0.66" | 660 m || 
|-id=395 bgcolor=#fefefe
| 313395 ||  || — || July 6, 2002 || Palomar || NEAT || V || align=right data-sort-value="0.73" | 730 m || 
|-id=396 bgcolor=#fefefe
| 313396 ||  || — || July 14, 2002 || Palomar || NEAT || — || align=right data-sort-value="0.88" | 880 m || 
|-id=397 bgcolor=#fefefe
| 313397 ||  || — || May 8, 2005 || Kitt Peak || Spacewatch || — || align=right | 1.5 km || 
|-id=398 bgcolor=#E9E9E9
| 313398 ||  || — || December 31, 2007 || Mount Lemmon || Mount Lemmon Survey || — || align=right | 1.0 km || 
|-id=399 bgcolor=#E9E9E9
| 313399 ||  || — || August 6, 2002 || Palomar || NEAT || — || align=right | 1.2 km || 
|-id=400 bgcolor=#fefefe
| 313400 ||  || — || August 8, 2002 || Palomar || NEAT || — || align=right | 1.2 km || 
|}

313401–313500 

|-bgcolor=#d6d6d6
| 313401 ||  || — || August 11, 2002 || Socorro || LINEAR || — || align=right | 5.4 km || 
|-id=402 bgcolor=#fefefe
| 313402 ||  || — || August 8, 2002 || Palomar || NEAT || — || align=right | 1.1 km || 
|-id=403 bgcolor=#E9E9E9
| 313403 ||  || — || August 11, 2002 || Palomar || NEAT || — || align=right | 1.4 km || 
|-id=404 bgcolor=#E9E9E9
| 313404 ||  || — || August 12, 2002 || Socorro || LINEAR || — || align=right | 1.3 km || 
|-id=405 bgcolor=#E9E9E9
| 313405 ||  || — || August 12, 2002 || Socorro || LINEAR || — || align=right | 1.3 km || 
|-id=406 bgcolor=#E9E9E9
| 313406 ||  || — || August 14, 2002 || Socorro || LINEAR || — || align=right | 1.4 km || 
|-id=407 bgcolor=#E9E9E9
| 313407 ||  || — || August 15, 2002 || Socorro || LINEAR || — || align=right | 1.1 km || 
|-id=408 bgcolor=#fefefe
| 313408 ||  || — || August 11, 2002 || Palomar || NEAT || H || align=right data-sort-value="0.76" | 760 m || 
|-id=409 bgcolor=#fefefe
| 313409 ||  || — || August 8, 2002 || Palomar || S. F. Hönig || H || align=right data-sort-value="0.59" | 590 m || 
|-id=410 bgcolor=#E9E9E9
| 313410 ||  || — || August 8, 2002 || Palomar || S. F. Hönig || — || align=right | 1.2 km || 
|-id=411 bgcolor=#d6d6d6
| 313411 ||  || — || August 7, 2002 || Palomar || NEAT || EUP || align=right | 3.6 km || 
|-id=412 bgcolor=#E9E9E9
| 313412 ||  || — || August 8, 2002 || Palomar || NEAT || — || align=right data-sort-value="0.82" | 820 m || 
|-id=413 bgcolor=#d6d6d6
| 313413 ||  || — || August 7, 2002 || Palomar || NEAT || 7:4 || align=right | 5.5 km || 
|-id=414 bgcolor=#fefefe
| 313414 ||  || — || August 8, 2002 || Palomar || NEAT || — || align=right data-sort-value="0.88" | 880 m || 
|-id=415 bgcolor=#E9E9E9
| 313415 ||  || — || August 8, 2002 || Palomar || NEAT || — || align=right | 1.1 km || 
|-id=416 bgcolor=#fefefe
| 313416 ||  || — || August 8, 2002 || Palomar || NEAT || NYS || align=right data-sort-value="0.67" | 670 m || 
|-id=417 bgcolor=#fefefe
| 313417 ||  || — || May 26, 2006 || Mount Lemmon || Mount Lemmon Survey || — || align=right | 1.4 km || 
|-id=418 bgcolor=#E9E9E9
| 313418 ||  || — || August 16, 2002 || Palomar || NEAT || — || align=right | 1.5 km || 
|-id=419 bgcolor=#E9E9E9
| 313419 ||  || — || August 8, 2002 || Palomar || NEAT || — || align=right | 1.1 km || 
|-id=420 bgcolor=#fefefe
| 313420 ||  || — || August 29, 2002 || Palomar || NEAT || — || align=right data-sort-value="0.91" | 910 m || 
|-id=421 bgcolor=#E9E9E9
| 313421 ||  || — || August 30, 2002 || Palomar || NEAT || — || align=right | 3.5 km || 
|-id=422 bgcolor=#d6d6d6
| 313422 ||  || — || August 29, 2002 || Palomar || S. F. Hönig || — || align=right | 3.8 km || 
|-id=423 bgcolor=#E9E9E9
| 313423 ||  || — || August 29, 2002 || Palomar || R. Matson || critical || align=right | 1.0 km || 
|-id=424 bgcolor=#E9E9E9
| 313424 ||  || — || August 29, 2002 || Palomar || S. F. Hönig || — || align=right | 1.1 km || 
|-id=425 bgcolor=#fefefe
| 313425 ||  || — || August 29, 2002 || Palomar || S. F. Hönig || — || align=right | 1.0 km || 
|-id=426 bgcolor=#fefefe
| 313426 ||  || — || August 18, 2002 || Palomar || NEAT || — || align=right | 1.2 km || 
|-id=427 bgcolor=#fefefe
| 313427 ||  || — || August 30, 2002 || Palomar || NEAT || V || align=right data-sort-value="0.72" | 720 m || 
|-id=428 bgcolor=#E9E9E9
| 313428 ||  || — || August 17, 2002 || Palomar || NEAT || critical || align=right | 1.1 km || 
|-id=429 bgcolor=#fefefe
| 313429 ||  || — || August 17, 2002 || Palomar || NEAT || V || align=right data-sort-value="0.89" | 890 m || 
|-id=430 bgcolor=#E9E9E9
| 313430 ||  || — || August 17, 2002 || Palomar || NEAT || — || align=right | 1.1 km || 
|-id=431 bgcolor=#E9E9E9
| 313431 ||  || — || August 18, 2002 || Palomar || NEAT || — || align=right data-sort-value="0.94" | 940 m || 
|-id=432 bgcolor=#fefefe
| 313432 ||  || — || August 18, 2002 || Palomar || NEAT || — || align=right data-sort-value="0.92" | 920 m || 
|-id=433 bgcolor=#E9E9E9
| 313433 ||  || — || August 17, 2002 || Palomar || NEAT || — || align=right | 3.8 km || 
|-id=434 bgcolor=#fefefe
| 313434 ||  || — || July 23, 2002 || Palomar || NEAT || — || align=right | 1.1 km || 
|-id=435 bgcolor=#fefefe
| 313435 ||  || — || September 4, 2002 || Anderson Mesa || LONEOS || V || align=right | 1.1 km || 
|-id=436 bgcolor=#E9E9E9
| 313436 ||  || — || September 3, 2002 || Palomar || NEAT || — || align=right | 1.4 km || 
|-id=437 bgcolor=#E9E9E9
| 313437 ||  || — || September 3, 2002 || Haleakala || NEAT || — || align=right | 1.2 km || 
|-id=438 bgcolor=#E9E9E9
| 313438 ||  || — || September 4, 2002 || Anderson Mesa || LONEOS || — || align=right | 1.1 km || 
|-id=439 bgcolor=#E9E9E9
| 313439 ||  || — || September 5, 2002 || Socorro || LINEAR || — || align=right | 2.2 km || 
|-id=440 bgcolor=#E9E9E9
| 313440 ||  || — || September 5, 2002 || Socorro || LINEAR || — || align=right | 1.3 km || 
|-id=441 bgcolor=#FA8072
| 313441 ||  || — || September 5, 2002 || Socorro || LINEAR || — || align=right | 1.7 km || 
|-id=442 bgcolor=#E9E9E9
| 313442 ||  || — || September 11, 2002 || Palomar || NEAT || — || align=right | 1.8 km || 
|-id=443 bgcolor=#fefefe
| 313443 ||  || — || September 11, 2002 || Palomar || NEAT || — || align=right | 1.1 km || 
|-id=444 bgcolor=#E9E9E9
| 313444 ||  || — || September 12, 2002 || Palomar || NEAT || — || align=right data-sort-value="0.95" | 950 m || 
|-id=445 bgcolor=#E9E9E9
| 313445 ||  || — || September 13, 2002 || Palomar || NEAT || — || align=right data-sort-value="0.98" | 980 m || 
|-id=446 bgcolor=#E9E9E9
| 313446 ||  || — || September 13, 2002 || Palomar || NEAT || — || align=right | 1.1 km || 
|-id=447 bgcolor=#E9E9E9
| 313447 ||  || — || September 11, 2002 || Palomar || NEAT || EUN || align=right | 1.6 km || 
|-id=448 bgcolor=#E9E9E9
| 313448 ||  || — || September 12, 2002 || Palomar || NEAT || — || align=right | 1.3 km || 
|-id=449 bgcolor=#fefefe
| 313449 ||  || — || September 12, 2002 || Palomar || NEAT || NYS || align=right data-sort-value="0.89" | 890 m || 
|-id=450 bgcolor=#d6d6d6
| 313450 ||  || — || September 14, 2002 || Haleakala || NEAT || SYL7:4 || align=right | 5.9 km || 
|-id=451 bgcolor=#E9E9E9
| 313451 ||  || — || September 13, 2002 || Haleakala || NEAT || — || align=right | 1.2 km || 
|-id=452 bgcolor=#E9E9E9
| 313452 ||  || — || September 14, 2002 || Palomar || NEAT || — || align=right data-sort-value="0.85" | 850 m || 
|-id=453 bgcolor=#fefefe
| 313453 ||  || — || September 13, 2002 || Palomar || NEAT || — || align=right data-sort-value="0.93" | 930 m || 
|-id=454 bgcolor=#fefefe
| 313454 ||  || — || September 15, 2002 || Palomar || NEAT || — || align=right data-sort-value="0.84" | 840 m || 
|-id=455 bgcolor=#E9E9E9
| 313455 ||  || — || September 26, 2002 || Palomar || NEAT || — || align=right | 1.5 km || 
|-id=456 bgcolor=#E9E9E9
| 313456 ||  || — || September 27, 2002 || Palomar || NEAT || — || align=right | 1.2 km || 
|-id=457 bgcolor=#E9E9E9
| 313457 ||  || — || September 28, 2002 || Haleakala || NEAT || — || align=right | 3.0 km || 
|-id=458 bgcolor=#E9E9E9
| 313458 ||  || — || September 29, 2002 || Haleakala || NEAT || JUN || align=right | 1.2 km || 
|-id=459 bgcolor=#E9E9E9
| 313459 ||  || — || September 29, 2002 || Kitt Peak || Spacewatch || — || align=right data-sort-value="0.91" | 910 m || 
|-id=460 bgcolor=#E9E9E9
| 313460 ||  || — || September 30, 2002 || Socorro || LINEAR || — || align=right data-sort-value="0.86" | 860 m || 
|-id=461 bgcolor=#E9E9E9
| 313461 ||  || — || September 29, 2002 || Haleakala || NEAT || EUN || align=right | 2.0 km || 
|-id=462 bgcolor=#E9E9E9
| 313462 ||  || — || September 17, 2002 || Palomar || NEAT || — || align=right | 1.2 km || 
|-id=463 bgcolor=#E9E9E9
| 313463 ||  || — || October 1, 2002 || Anderson Mesa || LONEOS || — || align=right | 1.2 km || 
|-id=464 bgcolor=#E9E9E9
| 313464 ||  || — || October 1, 2002 || Socorro || LINEAR || — || align=right | 1.3 km || 
|-id=465 bgcolor=#E9E9E9
| 313465 ||  || — || October 2, 2002 || Socorro || LINEAR || — || align=right | 1.7 km || 
|-id=466 bgcolor=#E9E9E9
| 313466 ||  || — || October 2, 2002 || Socorro || LINEAR || — || align=right | 1.5 km || 
|-id=467 bgcolor=#E9E9E9
| 313467 ||  || — || October 2, 2002 || Haleakala || NEAT || — || align=right | 2.4 km || 
|-id=468 bgcolor=#E9E9E9
| 313468 ||  || — || October 3, 2002 || Socorro || LINEAR || — || align=right | 1.2 km || 
|-id=469 bgcolor=#E9E9E9
| 313469 ||  || — || October 2, 2002 || Socorro || LINEAR || KRM || align=right | 2.4 km || 
|-id=470 bgcolor=#d6d6d6
| 313470 ||  || — || October 3, 2002 || Palomar || NEAT || 7:4 || align=right | 6.7 km || 
|-id=471 bgcolor=#E9E9E9
| 313471 ||  || — || October 3, 2002 || Palomar || NEAT || JUN || align=right | 1.1 km || 
|-id=472 bgcolor=#E9E9E9
| 313472 ||  || — || October 4, 2002 || Palomar || NEAT || — || align=right | 1.2 km || 
|-id=473 bgcolor=#E9E9E9
| 313473 ||  || — || October 5, 2002 || Palomar || NEAT || — || align=right data-sort-value="0.90" | 900 m || 
|-id=474 bgcolor=#E9E9E9
| 313474 ||  || — || October 5, 2002 || Palomar || NEAT || ADE || align=right | 3.7 km || 
|-id=475 bgcolor=#E9E9E9
| 313475 ||  || — || October 5, 2002 || Palomar || NEAT || JUN || align=right | 1.2 km || 
|-id=476 bgcolor=#E9E9E9
| 313476 ||  || — || October 13, 2002 || Palomar || NEAT || EUN || align=right | 1.8 km || 
|-id=477 bgcolor=#FA8072
| 313477 ||  || — || October 14, 2002 || Socorro || LINEAR || — || align=right | 3.4 km || 
|-id=478 bgcolor=#E9E9E9
| 313478 ||  || — || October 4, 2002 || Socorro || LINEAR || — || align=right | 1.8 km || 
|-id=479 bgcolor=#E9E9E9
| 313479 ||  || — || October 5, 2002 || Socorro || LINEAR || KON || align=right | 3.2 km || 
|-id=480 bgcolor=#E9E9E9
| 313480 ||  || — || October 6, 2002 || Palomar || NEAT || — || align=right | 2.4 km || 
|-id=481 bgcolor=#E9E9E9
| 313481 ||  || — || October 9, 2002 || Anderson Mesa || LONEOS || — || align=right | 1.0 km || 
|-id=482 bgcolor=#E9E9E9
| 313482 ||  || — || October 9, 2002 || Anderson Mesa || LONEOS || — || align=right | 1.2 km || 
|-id=483 bgcolor=#E9E9E9
| 313483 ||  || — || October 10, 2002 || Socorro || LINEAR || — || align=right | 2.6 km || 
|-id=484 bgcolor=#E9E9E9
| 313484 ||  || — || October 9, 2002 || Socorro || LINEAR || — || align=right | 1.7 km || 
|-id=485 bgcolor=#E9E9E9
| 313485 ||  || — || October 13, 2002 || Kitt Peak || Spacewatch || MIS || align=right | 2.4 km || 
|-id=486 bgcolor=#E9E9E9
| 313486 ||  || — || October 5, 2002 || Apache Point || SDSS || — || align=right data-sort-value="0.92" | 920 m || 
|-id=487 bgcolor=#E9E9E9
| 313487 ||  || — || October 10, 2002 || Apache Point || SDSS || — || align=right | 2.8 km || 
|-id=488 bgcolor=#fefefe
| 313488 ||  || — || October 10, 2002 || Apache Point || SDSS || NYS || align=right data-sort-value="0.82" | 820 m || 
|-id=489 bgcolor=#E9E9E9
| 313489 ||  || — || October 10, 2002 || Apache Point || SDSS || KON || align=right | 2.3 km || 
|-id=490 bgcolor=#E9E9E9
| 313490 ||  || — || October 10, 2002 || Apache Point || SDSS || — || align=right | 1.1 km || 
|-id=491 bgcolor=#fefefe
| 313491 ||  || — || October 29, 2002 || Apache Point || SDSS || V || align=right data-sort-value="0.85" | 850 m || 
|-id=492 bgcolor=#E9E9E9
| 313492 ||  || — || November 2, 2002 || Haleakala || NEAT || — || align=right | 1.1 km || 
|-id=493 bgcolor=#E9E9E9
| 313493 ||  || — || November 1, 2002 || Palomar || NEAT || — || align=right | 1.5 km || 
|-id=494 bgcolor=#E9E9E9
| 313494 ||  || — || November 5, 2002 || Anderson Mesa || LONEOS || RAF || align=right | 1.5 km || 
|-id=495 bgcolor=#E9E9E9
| 313495 ||  || — || November 5, 2002 || Socorro || LINEAR || — || align=right | 1.8 km || 
|-id=496 bgcolor=#E9E9E9
| 313496 ||  || — || November 4, 2002 || Haleakala || NEAT || — || align=right | 2.0 km || 
|-id=497 bgcolor=#E9E9E9
| 313497 ||  || — || November 5, 2002 || Socorro || LINEAR || — || align=right | 1.4 km || 
|-id=498 bgcolor=#E9E9E9
| 313498 ||  || — || November 6, 2002 || Socorro || LINEAR || JUN || align=right | 1.3 km || 
|-id=499 bgcolor=#E9E9E9
| 313499 ||  || — || November 5, 2002 || Palomar || NEAT || MIS || align=right | 3.0 km || 
|-id=500 bgcolor=#E9E9E9
| 313500 ||  || — || November 4, 2002 || Palomar || NEAT || — || align=right data-sort-value="0.99" | 990 m || 
|}

313501–313600 

|-bgcolor=#E9E9E9
| 313501 ||  || — || November 7, 2002 || Socorro || LINEAR || — || align=right | 1.3 km || 
|-id=502 bgcolor=#E9E9E9
| 313502 ||  || — || November 7, 2002 || Socorro || LINEAR || EUN || align=right | 1.6 km || 
|-id=503 bgcolor=#E9E9E9
| 313503 ||  || — || November 11, 2002 || Socorro || LINEAR || EUN || align=right | 1.6 km || 
|-id=504 bgcolor=#E9E9E9
| 313504 ||  || — || November 11, 2002 || Kingsnake || J. V. McClusky || MAR || align=right | 1.3 km || 
|-id=505 bgcolor=#E9E9E9
| 313505 ||  || — || November 12, 2002 || Anderson Mesa || LONEOS || — || align=right | 2.5 km || 
|-id=506 bgcolor=#E9E9E9
| 313506 ||  || — || November 12, 2002 || Socorro || LINEAR || — || align=right | 1.8 km || 
|-id=507 bgcolor=#E9E9E9
| 313507 ||  || — || November 12, 2002 || Palomar || NEAT || — || align=right | 2.4 km || 
|-id=508 bgcolor=#E9E9E9
| 313508 ||  || — || November 15, 2002 || Palomar || NEAT || EUN || align=right | 1.5 km || 
|-id=509 bgcolor=#E9E9E9
| 313509 ||  || — || November 14, 2002 || Palomar || NEAT || KON || align=right | 2.9 km || 
|-id=510 bgcolor=#E9E9E9
| 313510 ||  || — || November 6, 2002 || Socorro || LINEAR || — || align=right | 1.4 km || 
|-id=511 bgcolor=#E9E9E9
| 313511 ||  || — || November 13, 2002 || Palomar || NEAT || — || align=right | 2.0 km || 
|-id=512 bgcolor=#E9E9E9
| 313512 ||  || — || November 6, 2002 || Palomar || NEAT || — || align=right | 2.4 km || 
|-id=513 bgcolor=#E9E9E9
| 313513 ||  || — || April 2, 2005 || Kitt Peak || Spacewatch || PAD || align=right | 2.3 km || 
|-id=514 bgcolor=#E9E9E9
| 313514 ||  || — || November 24, 2002 || Palomar || NEAT || — || align=right | 2.1 km || 
|-id=515 bgcolor=#E9E9E9
| 313515 ||  || — || November 24, 2002 || Palomar || NEAT || — || align=right | 1.6 km || 
|-id=516 bgcolor=#E9E9E9
| 313516 ||  || — || November 30, 2002 || Socorro || LINEAR || JUN || align=right | 1.6 km || 
|-id=517 bgcolor=#E9E9E9
| 313517 ||  || — || November 24, 2002 || Palomar || NEAT || — || align=right | 2.4 km || 
|-id=518 bgcolor=#E9E9E9
| 313518 ||  || — || December 1, 2002 || Socorro || LINEAR || — || align=right | 1.5 km || 
|-id=519 bgcolor=#E9E9E9
| 313519 ||  || — || December 4, 2002 || Desert Eagle || W. K. Y. Yeung || — || align=right | 2.1 km || 
|-id=520 bgcolor=#E9E9E9
| 313520 ||  || — || December 2, 2002 || Socorro || LINEAR || — || align=right | 1.8 km || 
|-id=521 bgcolor=#E9E9E9
| 313521 ||  || — || December 3, 2002 || Palomar || NEAT || BAR || align=right | 2.0 km || 
|-id=522 bgcolor=#E9E9E9
| 313522 ||  || — || December 3, 2002 || Palomar || NEAT || — || align=right | 2.4 km || 
|-id=523 bgcolor=#E9E9E9
| 313523 ||  || — || December 3, 2002 || Palomar || NEAT || EUN || align=right | 1.7 km || 
|-id=524 bgcolor=#E9E9E9
| 313524 ||  || — || December 3, 2002 || Palomar || NEAT || — || align=right | 2.7 km || 
|-id=525 bgcolor=#E9E9E9
| 313525 ||  || — || December 6, 2002 || Socorro || LINEAR || — || align=right | 1.8 km || 
|-id=526 bgcolor=#E9E9E9
| 313526 ||  || — || December 6, 2002 || Socorro || LINEAR || — || align=right | 3.7 km || 
|-id=527 bgcolor=#E9E9E9
| 313527 ||  || — || December 7, 2002 || Socorro || LINEAR || — || align=right | 3.1 km || 
|-id=528 bgcolor=#E9E9E9
| 313528 ||  || — || December 7, 2002 || Desert Eagle || W. K. Y. Yeung || MIS || align=right | 2.4 km || 
|-id=529 bgcolor=#E9E9E9
| 313529 ||  || — || December 6, 2002 || Socorro || LINEAR || BRU || align=right | 4.0 km || 
|-id=530 bgcolor=#E9E9E9
| 313530 ||  || — || December 10, 2002 || Palomar || NEAT || — || align=right | 2.0 km || 
|-id=531 bgcolor=#E9E9E9
| 313531 ||  || — || December 10, 2002 || Socorro || LINEAR || — || align=right | 1.9 km || 
|-id=532 bgcolor=#E9E9E9
| 313532 ||  || — || December 11, 2002 || Socorro || LINEAR || EUN || align=right | 1.9 km || 
|-id=533 bgcolor=#E9E9E9
| 313533 ||  || — || December 12, 2002 || Palomar || NEAT || — || align=right | 1.7 km || 
|-id=534 bgcolor=#E9E9E9
| 313534 ||  || — || December 5, 2002 || Kitt Peak || M. W. Buie || MAR || align=right | 1.3 km || 
|-id=535 bgcolor=#E9E9E9
| 313535 ||  || — || December 7, 2002 || Palomar || NEAT || — || align=right | 1.4 km || 
|-id=536 bgcolor=#E9E9E9
| 313536 ||  || — || December 11, 2002 || Palomar || NEAT || — || align=right | 1.5 km || 
|-id=537 bgcolor=#E9E9E9
| 313537 ||  || — || December 31, 2002 || Socorro || LINEAR || PAL || align=right | 2.1 km || 
|-id=538 bgcolor=#FFC2E0
| 313538 ||  || — || December 31, 2002 || Socorro || LINEAR || APO || align=right data-sort-value="0.74" | 740 m || 
|-id=539 bgcolor=#E9E9E9
| 313539 ||  || — || December 31, 2002 || Socorro || LINEAR || JUN || align=right | 1.4 km || 
|-id=540 bgcolor=#E9E9E9
| 313540 ||  || — || January 5, 2003 || Socorro || LINEAR || — || align=right | 3.1 km || 
|-id=541 bgcolor=#E9E9E9
| 313541 ||  || — || January 5, 2003 || Socorro || LINEAR || — || align=right | 2.5 km || 
|-id=542 bgcolor=#E9E9E9
| 313542 ||  || — || January 8, 2003 || Socorro || LINEAR || VIB || align=right | 2.5 km || 
|-id=543 bgcolor=#E9E9E9
| 313543 ||  || — || December 5, 2002 || Socorro || LINEAR || — || align=right | 1.8 km || 
|-id=544 bgcolor=#E9E9E9
| 313544 ||  || — || January 10, 2003 || Socorro || LINEAR || — || align=right | 3.9 km || 
|-id=545 bgcolor=#E9E9E9
| 313545 ||  || — || January 10, 2003 || Socorro || LINEAR || JUN || align=right | 1.2 km || 
|-id=546 bgcolor=#E9E9E9
| 313546 ||  || — || January 13, 2003 || Socorro || LINEAR || EUN || align=right | 4.9 km || 
|-id=547 bgcolor=#E9E9E9
| 313547 ||  || — || January 7, 2003 || Socorro || LINEAR || — || align=right | 2.2 km || 
|-id=548 bgcolor=#FFC2E0
| 313548 ||  || — || January 23, 2003 || Socorro || LINEAR || AMO || align=right data-sort-value="0.48" | 480 m || 
|-id=549 bgcolor=#E9E9E9
| 313549 ||  || — || January 24, 2003 || La Silla || A. Boattini, H. Scholl || — || align=right | 2.5 km || 
|-id=550 bgcolor=#E9E9E9
| 313550 ||  || — || January 23, 2003 || La Silla || A. Boattini, H. Scholl || — || align=right | 2.4 km || 
|-id=551 bgcolor=#E9E9E9
| 313551 ||  || — || January 26, 2003 || Haleakala || NEAT || — || align=right | 3.0 km || 
|-id=552 bgcolor=#FFC2E0
| 313552 ||  || — || January 28, 2003 || Haleakala || NEAT || APO || align=right data-sort-value="0.24" | 240 m || 
|-id=553 bgcolor=#E9E9E9
| 313553 ||  || — || January 27, 2003 || Kitt Peak || Spacewatch || — || align=right | 2.6 km || 
|-id=554 bgcolor=#E9E9E9
| 313554 ||  || — || January 28, 2003 || Socorro || LINEAR || EUN || align=right | 2.2 km || 
|-id=555 bgcolor=#E9E9E9
| 313555 ||  || — || January 27, 2003 || Anderson Mesa || LONEOS || GEF || align=right | 1.7 km || 
|-id=556 bgcolor=#E9E9E9
| 313556 ||  || — || January 31, 2003 || Kitt Peak || Spacewatch || — || align=right | 3.4 km || 
|-id=557 bgcolor=#E9E9E9
| 313557 ||  || — || January 28, 2003 || Socorro || LINEAR || — || align=right | 2.5 km || 
|-id=558 bgcolor=#E9E9E9
| 313558 ||  || — || January 29, 2003 || Palomar || NEAT || — || align=right | 2.1 km || 
|-id=559 bgcolor=#E9E9E9
| 313559 ||  || — || January 29, 2003 || Palomar || NEAT || — || align=right | 2.2 km || 
|-id=560 bgcolor=#E9E9E9
| 313560 ||  || — || January 29, 2003 || Palomar || NEAT || GEF || align=right | 1.5 km || 
|-id=561 bgcolor=#E9E9E9
| 313561 ||  || — || January 30, 2003 || Haleakala || NEAT || — || align=right | 2.7 km || 
|-id=562 bgcolor=#E9E9E9
| 313562 ||  || — || January 30, 2003 || Anderson Mesa || LONEOS || — || align=right | 2.0 km || 
|-id=563 bgcolor=#E9E9E9
| 313563 ||  || — || January 27, 2003 || Socorro || LINEAR || — || align=right | 2.8 km || 
|-id=564 bgcolor=#E9E9E9
| 313564 ||  || — || January 29, 2003 || Palomar || NEAT || — || align=right | 1.8 km || 
|-id=565 bgcolor=#E9E9E9
| 313565 ||  || — || January 7, 2003 || Socorro || LINEAR || ADE || align=right | 3.2 km || 
|-id=566 bgcolor=#E9E9E9
| 313566 ||  || — || February 9, 2003 || Palomar || NEAT || — || align=right | 2.2 km || 
|-id=567 bgcolor=#E9E9E9
| 313567 ||  || — || February 19, 2003 || Haleakala || NEAT || CLO || align=right | 2.8 km || 
|-id=568 bgcolor=#E9E9E9
| 313568 ||  || — || February 22, 2003 || Palomar || NEAT || — || align=right | 3.9 km || 
|-id=569 bgcolor=#E9E9E9
| 313569 ||  || — || February 22, 2003 || Palomar || NEAT || — || align=right | 3.1 km || 
|-id=570 bgcolor=#E9E9E9
| 313570 ||  || — || February 23, 2003 || Campo Imperatore || CINEOS || — || align=right | 2.5 km || 
|-id=571 bgcolor=#E9E9E9
| 313571 ||  || — || February 23, 2003 || Campo Imperatore || CINEOS || — || align=right | 2.7 km || 
|-id=572 bgcolor=#E9E9E9
| 313572 ||  || — || February 26, 2003 || Socorro || LINEAR || — || align=right | 2.9 km || 
|-id=573 bgcolor=#E9E9E9
| 313573 ||  || — || February 22, 2003 || Palomar || NEAT || — || align=right | 2.4 km || 
|-id=574 bgcolor=#E9E9E9
| 313574 ||  || — || March 6, 2003 || Socorro || LINEAR || — || align=right | 2.7 km || 
|-id=575 bgcolor=#E9E9E9
| 313575 ||  || — || March 5, 2003 || Socorro || LINEAR || — || align=right | 3.4 km || 
|-id=576 bgcolor=#E9E9E9
| 313576 ||  || — || March 7, 2003 || Palomar || NEAT || JUN || align=right | 1.3 km || 
|-id=577 bgcolor=#E9E9E9
| 313577 ||  || — || March 7, 2003 || Anderson Mesa || LONEOS || EUN || align=right | 1.8 km || 
|-id=578 bgcolor=#E9E9E9
| 313578 ||  || — || March 7, 2003 || Socorro || LINEAR || — || align=right | 3.4 km || 
|-id=579 bgcolor=#E9E9E9
| 313579 ||  || — || March 8, 2003 || Palomar || NEAT || — || align=right | 2.2 km || 
|-id=580 bgcolor=#C2FFFF
| 313580 ||  || — || March 11, 2003 || Palomar || NEAT || L4 || align=right | 12 km || 
|-id=581 bgcolor=#E9E9E9
| 313581 ||  || — || March 24, 2003 || Socorro || LINEAR || — || align=right | 3.9 km || 
|-id=582 bgcolor=#E9E9E9
| 313582 ||  || — || March 24, 2003 || Kitt Peak || Spacewatch || — || align=right | 2.9 km || 
|-id=583 bgcolor=#E9E9E9
| 313583 ||  || — || March 24, 2003 || Kitt Peak || Spacewatch || — || align=right | 3.5 km || 
|-id=584 bgcolor=#d6d6d6
| 313584 ||  || — || March 23, 2003 || Kitt Peak || Spacewatch || — || align=right | 2.9 km || 
|-id=585 bgcolor=#d6d6d6
| 313585 ||  || — || March 23, 2003 || Kitt Peak || Spacewatch || CHA || align=right | 2.2 km || 
|-id=586 bgcolor=#E9E9E9
| 313586 ||  || — || March 29, 2003 || Kitt Peak || Spacewatch || EUN || align=right | 2.0 km || 
|-id=587 bgcolor=#E9E9E9
| 313587 ||  || — || March 26, 2003 || Palomar || NEAT || GEF || align=right | 1.7 km || 
|-id=588 bgcolor=#d6d6d6
| 313588 ||  || — || April 9, 2003 || Palomar || NEAT || — || align=right | 3.0 km || 
|-id=589 bgcolor=#E9E9E9
| 313589 ||  || — || April 29, 2003 || Haleakala || NEAT || — || align=right | 3.1 km || 
|-id=590 bgcolor=#d6d6d6
| 313590 ||  || — || May 23, 2003 || Kitt Peak || Spacewatch || EOS || align=right | 1.8 km || 
|-id=591 bgcolor=#FA8072
| 313591 ||  || — || June 28, 2003 || Socorro || LINEAR || — || align=right | 1.6 km || 
|-id=592 bgcolor=#d6d6d6
| 313592 ||  || — || July 2, 2003 || Socorro || LINEAR || THB || align=right | 4.0 km || 
|-id=593 bgcolor=#FA8072
| 313593 ||  || — || July 4, 2003 || Socorro || LINEAR || — || align=right | 1.3 km || 
|-id=594 bgcolor=#FA8072
| 313594 ||  || — || July 6, 2003 || Reedy Creek || J. Broughton || — || align=right data-sort-value="0.92" | 920 m || 
|-id=595 bgcolor=#fefefe
| 313595 ||  || — || July 7, 2003 || Kitt Peak || Spacewatch || — || align=right | 1.3 km || 
|-id=596 bgcolor=#fefefe
| 313596 ||  || — || July 25, 2003 || Reedy Creek || J. Broughton || — || align=right | 1.8 km || 
|-id=597 bgcolor=#fefefe
| 313597 ||  || — || July 26, 2003 || Reedy Creek || J. Broughton || — || align=right | 1.0 km || 
|-id=598 bgcolor=#d6d6d6
| 313598 ||  || — || July 27, 2003 || Reedy Creek || J. Broughton || TIR || align=right | 4.5 km || 
|-id=599 bgcolor=#d6d6d6
| 313599 ||  || — || July 30, 2003 || Campo Imperatore || CINEOS || — || align=right | 4.3 km || 
|-id=600 bgcolor=#fefefe
| 313600 ||  || — || July 24, 2003 || Palomar || NEAT || FLO || align=right data-sort-value="0.86" | 860 m || 
|}

313601–313700 

|-bgcolor=#d6d6d6
| 313601 ||  || — || July 24, 2003 || Palomar || NEAT || — || align=right | 4.1 km || 
|-id=602 bgcolor=#fefefe
| 313602 ||  || — || August 1, 2003 || Socorro || LINEAR || — || align=right | 1.9 km || 
|-id=603 bgcolor=#fefefe
| 313603 ||  || — || August 17, 2003 || Haleakala || NEAT || — || align=right data-sort-value="0.93" | 930 m || 
|-id=604 bgcolor=#fefefe
| 313604 ||  || — || August 22, 2003 || Palomar || NEAT || — || align=right | 1.3 km || 
|-id=605 bgcolor=#fefefe
| 313605 ||  || — || August 22, 2003 || Palomar || NEAT || FLO || align=right data-sort-value="0.87" | 870 m || 
|-id=606 bgcolor=#fefefe
| 313606 ||  || — || August 22, 2003 || Campo Imperatore || CINEOS || — || align=right data-sort-value="0.89" | 890 m || 
|-id=607 bgcolor=#FA8072
| 313607 ||  || — || August 24, 2003 || Reedy Creek || J. Broughton || — || align=right | 1.2 km || 
|-id=608 bgcolor=#d6d6d6
| 313608 ||  || — || August 22, 2003 || Palomar || NEAT || — || align=right | 4.1 km || 
|-id=609 bgcolor=#fefefe
| 313609 ||  || — || August 22, 2003 || Socorro || LINEAR || — || align=right | 1.1 km || 
|-id=610 bgcolor=#fefefe
| 313610 ||  || — || August 22, 2003 || Haleakala || NEAT || — || align=right | 1.1 km || 
|-id=611 bgcolor=#fefefe
| 313611 ||  || — || August 23, 2003 || Palomar || NEAT || NYS || align=right data-sort-value="0.84" | 840 m || 
|-id=612 bgcolor=#fefefe
| 313612 ||  || — || August 23, 2003 || Palomar || NEAT || NYS || align=right data-sort-value="0.81" | 810 m || 
|-id=613 bgcolor=#fefefe
| 313613 ||  || — || August 23, 2003 || Socorro || LINEAR || — || align=right | 2.2 km || 
|-id=614 bgcolor=#fefefe
| 313614 ||  || — || August 25, 2003 || Socorro || LINEAR || — || align=right | 1.1 km || 
|-id=615 bgcolor=#d6d6d6
| 313615 ||  || — || August 24, 2003 || Socorro || LINEAR || — || align=right | 4.6 km || 
|-id=616 bgcolor=#fefefe
| 313616 ||  || — || August 24, 2003 || Socorro || LINEAR || — || align=right | 1.2 km || 
|-id=617 bgcolor=#fefefe
| 313617 ||  || — || August 25, 2003 || Socorro || LINEAR || NYS || align=right data-sort-value="0.82" | 820 m || 
|-id=618 bgcolor=#fefefe
| 313618 ||  || — || August 29, 2003 || Socorro || LINEAR || EUT || align=right data-sort-value="0.85" | 850 m || 
|-id=619 bgcolor=#fefefe
| 313619 ||  || — || August 31, 2003 || Socorro || LINEAR || V || align=right | 1.0 km || 
|-id=620 bgcolor=#d6d6d6
| 313620 ||  || — || August 31, 2003 || Socorro || LINEAR || — || align=right | 4.3 km || 
|-id=621 bgcolor=#FA8072
| 313621 ||  || — || August 31, 2003 || Socorro || LINEAR || — || align=right | 1.1 km || 
|-id=622 bgcolor=#fefefe
| 313622 ||  || — || August 31, 2003 || Socorro || LINEAR || ERI || align=right | 2.2 km || 
|-id=623 bgcolor=#fefefe
| 313623 ||  || — || September 1, 2003 || Socorro || LINEAR || NYS || align=right data-sort-value="0.75" | 750 m || 
|-id=624 bgcolor=#fefefe
| 313624 ||  || — || September 14, 2003 || Palomar || NEAT || PHO || align=right | 1.7 km || 
|-id=625 bgcolor=#d6d6d6
| 313625 ||  || — || September 15, 2003 || Kleť || M. Tichý || — || align=right | 4.1 km || 
|-id=626 bgcolor=#fefefe
| 313626 ||  || — || September 15, 2003 || Palomar || NEAT || — || align=right data-sort-value="0.90" | 900 m || 
|-id=627 bgcolor=#fefefe
| 313627 ||  || — || September 15, 2003 || Anderson Mesa || LONEOS || — || align=right data-sort-value="0.98" | 980 m || 
|-id=628 bgcolor=#fefefe
| 313628 ||  || — || September 13, 2003 || Haleakala || NEAT || — || align=right | 1.3 km || 
|-id=629 bgcolor=#fefefe
| 313629 ||  || — || September 13, 2003 || Haleakala || NEAT || FLO || align=right data-sort-value="0.90" | 900 m || 
|-id=630 bgcolor=#d6d6d6
| 313630 ||  || — || September 2, 2003 || Socorro || LINEAR || URS || align=right | 4.8 km || 
|-id=631 bgcolor=#fefefe
| 313631 ||  || — || September 17, 2003 || Kitt Peak || Spacewatch || — || align=right data-sort-value="0.85" | 850 m || 
|-id=632 bgcolor=#fefefe
| 313632 ||  || — || September 17, 2003 || Socorro || LINEAR || H || align=right | 1.1 km || 
|-id=633 bgcolor=#fefefe
| 313633 ||  || — || September 17, 2003 || Kitt Peak || Spacewatch || — || align=right | 1.1 km || 
|-id=634 bgcolor=#d6d6d6
| 313634 ||  || — || September 17, 2003 || Kitt Peak || Spacewatch || — || align=right | 4.8 km || 
|-id=635 bgcolor=#fefefe
| 313635 ||  || — || September 18, 2003 || Kitt Peak || Spacewatch || MAS || align=right data-sort-value="0.82" | 820 m || 
|-id=636 bgcolor=#fefefe
| 313636 ||  || — || September 16, 2003 || Anderson Mesa || LONEOS || V || align=right data-sort-value="0.66" | 660 m || 
|-id=637 bgcolor=#fefefe
| 313637 ||  || — || September 18, 2003 || Kitt Peak || Spacewatch || NYS || align=right data-sort-value="0.64" | 640 m || 
|-id=638 bgcolor=#d6d6d6
| 313638 ||  || — || September 16, 2003 || Palomar || NEAT || — || align=right | 6.1 km || 
|-id=639 bgcolor=#fefefe
| 313639 ||  || — || September 16, 2003 || Anderson Mesa || LONEOS || — || align=right | 1.2 km || 
|-id=640 bgcolor=#fefefe
| 313640 ||  || — || September 18, 2003 || Palomar || NEAT || ERI || align=right | 2.2 km || 
|-id=641 bgcolor=#d6d6d6
| 313641 ||  || — || September 17, 2003 || Anderson Mesa || LONEOS || — || align=right | 5.1 km || 
|-id=642 bgcolor=#fefefe
| 313642 ||  || — || September 17, 2003 || Socorro || LINEAR || — || align=right | 1.0 km || 
|-id=643 bgcolor=#fefefe
| 313643 ||  || — || September 19, 2003 || Kitt Peak || Spacewatch || — || align=right data-sort-value="0.85" | 850 m || 
|-id=644 bgcolor=#fefefe
| 313644 ||  || — || September 19, 2003 || Kitt Peak || Spacewatch || — || align=right | 1.1 km || 
|-id=645 bgcolor=#fefefe
| 313645 ||  || — || September 20, 2003 || Socorro || LINEAR || — || align=right | 2.3 km || 
|-id=646 bgcolor=#fefefe
| 313646 ||  || — || September 17, 2003 || Kitt Peak || Spacewatch || MAS || align=right data-sort-value="0.63" | 630 m || 
|-id=647 bgcolor=#d6d6d6
| 313647 ||  || — || September 18, 2003 || Socorro || LINEAR || THB || align=right | 4.1 km || 
|-id=648 bgcolor=#fefefe
| 313648 ||  || — || September 18, 2003 || Črni Vrh || Črni Vrh || — || align=right | 1.6 km || 
|-id=649 bgcolor=#fefefe
| 313649 ||  || — || September 20, 2003 || Socorro || LINEAR || ERI || align=right | 2.0 km || 
|-id=650 bgcolor=#fefefe
| 313650 ||  || — || September 18, 2003 || Palomar || NEAT || — || align=right | 1.1 km || 
|-id=651 bgcolor=#fefefe
| 313651 ||  || — || September 19, 2003 || Anderson Mesa || LONEOS || — || align=right | 1.2 km || 
|-id=652 bgcolor=#fefefe
| 313652 ||  || — || September 20, 2003 || Socorro || LINEAR || — || align=right | 1.1 km || 
|-id=653 bgcolor=#fefefe
| 313653 ||  || — || September 20, 2003 || Anderson Mesa || LONEOS || — || align=right | 1.2 km || 
|-id=654 bgcolor=#fefefe
| 313654 ||  || — || September 20, 2003 || Anderson Mesa || LONEOS || V || align=right data-sort-value="0.94" | 940 m || 
|-id=655 bgcolor=#fefefe
| 313655 ||  || — || September 23, 2003 || Uccle || T. Pauwels || NYS || align=right data-sort-value="0.78" | 780 m || 
|-id=656 bgcolor=#fefefe
| 313656 ||  || — || September 18, 2003 || Palomar || NEAT || — || align=right | 1.1 km || 
|-id=657 bgcolor=#fefefe
| 313657 ||  || — || September 19, 2003 || Kitt Peak || Spacewatch || — || align=right | 1.2 km || 
|-id=658 bgcolor=#d6d6d6
| 313658 ||  || — || September 20, 2003 || Socorro || LINEAR || TIR || align=right | 4.3 km || 
|-id=659 bgcolor=#fefefe
| 313659 ||  || — || September 21, 2003 || Kitt Peak || Spacewatch || MAS || align=right data-sort-value="0.82" | 820 m || 
|-id=660 bgcolor=#fefefe
| 313660 ||  || — || September 21, 2003 || Kitt Peak || Spacewatch || NYS || align=right data-sort-value="0.70" | 700 m || 
|-id=661 bgcolor=#fefefe
| 313661 ||  || — || September 22, 2003 || Anderson Mesa || LONEOS || V || align=right data-sort-value="0.87" | 870 m || 
|-id=662 bgcolor=#fefefe
| 313662 ||  || — || September 24, 2003 || Palomar || NEAT || ERI || align=right | 1.9 km || 
|-id=663 bgcolor=#fefefe
| 313663 ||  || — || September 17, 2003 || Kitt Peak || Spacewatch || — || align=right | 1.3 km || 
|-id=664 bgcolor=#fefefe
| 313664 ||  || — || September 20, 2003 || Socorro || LINEAR || V || align=right data-sort-value="0.90" | 900 m || 
|-id=665 bgcolor=#E9E9E9
| 313665 ||  || — || September 20, 2003 || Palomar || NEAT || — || align=right | 1.1 km || 
|-id=666 bgcolor=#E9E9E9
| 313666 ||  || — || September 20, 2003 || Palomar || NEAT || — || align=right data-sort-value="0.93" | 930 m || 
|-id=667 bgcolor=#fefefe
| 313667 ||  || — || September 20, 2003 || Palomar || NEAT || V || align=right data-sort-value="0.73" | 730 m || 
|-id=668 bgcolor=#d6d6d6
| 313668 ||  || — || September 22, 2003 || Anderson Mesa || LONEOS || — || align=right | 5.1 km || 
|-id=669 bgcolor=#fefefe
| 313669 ||  || — || September 26, 2003 || Socorro || LINEAR || MAS || align=right | 1.2 km || 
|-id=670 bgcolor=#fefefe
| 313670 ||  || — || September 23, 2003 || Palomar || NEAT || — || align=right | 1.2 km || 
|-id=671 bgcolor=#fefefe
| 313671 ||  || — || September 24, 2003 || Haleakala || NEAT || — || align=right data-sort-value="0.75" | 750 m || 
|-id=672 bgcolor=#fefefe
| 313672 ||  || — || September 29, 2003 || Desert Eagle || W. K. Y. Yeung || — || align=right | 1.3 km || 
|-id=673 bgcolor=#fefefe
| 313673 ||  || — || September 30, 2003 || Desert Eagle || W. K. Y. Yeung || — || align=right | 1.2 km || 
|-id=674 bgcolor=#fefefe
| 313674 ||  || — || September 26, 2003 || Socorro || LINEAR || MAS || align=right data-sort-value="0.89" | 890 m || 
|-id=675 bgcolor=#fefefe
| 313675 ||  || — || September 27, 2003 || Socorro || LINEAR || — || align=right | 1.2 km || 
|-id=676 bgcolor=#d6d6d6
| 313676 ||  || — || September 24, 2003 || Palomar || NEAT || — || align=right | 4.2 km || 
|-id=677 bgcolor=#fefefe
| 313677 ||  || — || September 28, 2003 || Socorro || LINEAR || — || align=right | 2.2 km || 
|-id=678 bgcolor=#fefefe
| 313678 ||  || — || September 29, 2003 || Socorro || LINEAR || NYS || align=right data-sort-value="0.90" | 900 m || 
|-id=679 bgcolor=#fefefe
| 313679 ||  || — || September 30, 2003 || Socorro || LINEAR || ERI || align=right | 1.5 km || 
|-id=680 bgcolor=#fefefe
| 313680 ||  || — || September 30, 2003 || Kitt Peak || Spacewatch || NYS || align=right data-sort-value="0.76" | 760 m || 
|-id=681 bgcolor=#fefefe
| 313681 ||  || — || September 17, 2003 || Palomar || NEAT || — || align=right | 1.2 km || 
|-id=682 bgcolor=#fefefe
| 313682 ||  || — || September 17, 2003 || Palomar || NEAT || V || align=right data-sort-value="0.74" | 740 m || 
|-id=683 bgcolor=#fefefe
| 313683 ||  || — || September 27, 2003 || Socorro || LINEAR || — || align=right data-sort-value="0.97" | 970 m || 
|-id=684 bgcolor=#d6d6d6
| 313684 ||  || — || September 29, 2003 || Kitt Peak || Spacewatch || — || align=right | 3.9 km || 
|-id=685 bgcolor=#fefefe
| 313685 ||  || — || September 21, 2003 || Anderson Mesa || LONEOS || V || align=right data-sort-value="0.80" | 800 m || 
|-id=686 bgcolor=#d6d6d6
| 313686 ||  || — || September 16, 2003 || Kitt Peak || Spacewatch || THM || align=right | 2.9 km || 
|-id=687 bgcolor=#d6d6d6
| 313687 ||  || — || September 17, 2003 || Kitt Peak || Spacewatch || — || align=right | 2.9 km || 
|-id=688 bgcolor=#fefefe
| 313688 ||  || — || September 18, 2003 || Palomar || NEAT || — || align=right data-sort-value="0.93" | 930 m || 
|-id=689 bgcolor=#fefefe
| 313689 ||  || — || September 26, 2003 || Apache Point || SDSS || NYS || align=right data-sort-value="0.59" | 590 m || 
|-id=690 bgcolor=#fefefe
| 313690 ||  || — || September 26, 2003 || Apache Point || SDSS || MAS || align=right data-sort-value="0.81" | 810 m || 
|-id=691 bgcolor=#fefefe
| 313691 ||  || — || September 27, 2003 || Apache Point || SDSS || V || align=right data-sort-value="0.82" | 820 m || 
|-id=692 bgcolor=#fefefe
| 313692 ||  || — || October 1, 2003 || Anderson Mesa || LONEOS || — || align=right data-sort-value="0.95" | 950 m || 
|-id=693 bgcolor=#E9E9E9
| 313693 ||  || — || October 14, 2003 || Anderson Mesa || LONEOS || — || align=right | 3.1 km || 
|-id=694 bgcolor=#fefefe
| 313694 ||  || — || October 5, 2003 || Socorro || LINEAR || — || align=right | 2.8 km || 
|-id=695 bgcolor=#fefefe
| 313695 ||  || — || October 5, 2003 || Socorro || LINEAR || H || align=right data-sort-value="0.67" | 670 m || 
|-id=696 bgcolor=#fefefe
| 313696 ||  || — || October 15, 2003 || Anderson Mesa || LONEOS || — || align=right data-sort-value="0.94" | 940 m || 
|-id=697 bgcolor=#fefefe
| 313697 ||  || — || October 15, 2003 || Anderson Mesa || LONEOS || — || align=right | 1.2 km || 
|-id=698 bgcolor=#fefefe
| 313698 ||  || — || October 3, 2003 || Kitt Peak || Spacewatch || V || align=right data-sort-value="0.89" | 890 m || 
|-id=699 bgcolor=#fefefe
| 313699 ||  || — || October 3, 2003 || Haleakala || NEAT || — || align=right data-sort-value="0.97" | 970 m || 
|-id=700 bgcolor=#fefefe
| 313700 ||  || — || October 5, 2003 || Kitt Peak || Spacewatch || V || align=right data-sort-value="0.68" | 680 m || 
|}

313701–313800 

|-bgcolor=#fefefe
| 313701 ||  || — || October 16, 2003 || Socorro || LINEAR || H || align=right | 3.0 km || 
|-id=702 bgcolor=#fefefe
| 313702 ||  || — || October 22, 2003 || Socorro || LINEAR || ERI || align=right | 1.8 km || 
|-id=703 bgcolor=#fefefe
| 313703 ||  || — || October 21, 2003 || Kitt Peak || Spacewatch || FLO || align=right data-sort-value="0.97" | 970 m || 
|-id=704 bgcolor=#fefefe
| 313704 ||  || — || October 17, 2003 || Kitt Peak || Spacewatch || — || align=right data-sort-value="0.84" | 840 m || 
|-id=705 bgcolor=#d6d6d6
| 313705 ||  || — || October 17, 2003 || Kitt Peak || Spacewatch || — || align=right | 4.6 km || 
|-id=706 bgcolor=#fefefe
| 313706 ||  || — || October 21, 2003 || Socorro || LINEAR || NYS || align=right data-sort-value="0.94" | 940 m || 
|-id=707 bgcolor=#fefefe
| 313707 ||  || — || October 16, 2003 || Anderson Mesa || LONEOS || — || align=right | 1.0 km || 
|-id=708 bgcolor=#fefefe
| 313708 ||  || — || October 16, 2003 || Anderson Mesa || LONEOS || — || align=right | 1.7 km || 
|-id=709 bgcolor=#fefefe
| 313709 ||  || — || October 17, 2003 || Anderson Mesa || LONEOS || — || align=right | 1.1 km || 
|-id=710 bgcolor=#fefefe
| 313710 ||  || — || October 17, 2003 || Anderson Mesa || LONEOS || — || align=right | 1.0 km || 
|-id=711 bgcolor=#fefefe
| 313711 ||  || — || October 17, 2003 || Anderson Mesa || LONEOS || FLO || align=right data-sort-value="0.72" | 720 m || 
|-id=712 bgcolor=#fefefe
| 313712 ||  || — || October 19, 2003 || Anderson Mesa || LONEOS || — || align=right | 1.5 km || 
|-id=713 bgcolor=#fefefe
| 313713 ||  || — || October 18, 2003 || Kitt Peak || Spacewatch || NYS || align=right data-sort-value="0.80" | 800 m || 
|-id=714 bgcolor=#fefefe
| 313714 ||  || — || October 19, 2003 || Kitt Peak || Spacewatch || NYS || align=right data-sort-value="0.92" | 920 m || 
|-id=715 bgcolor=#fefefe
| 313715 ||  || — || October 20, 2003 || Socorro || LINEAR || V || align=right data-sort-value="0.87" | 870 m || 
|-id=716 bgcolor=#fefefe
| 313716 ||  || — || October 17, 2003 || Kitt Peak || Spacewatch || NYS || align=right data-sort-value="0.70" | 700 m || 
|-id=717 bgcolor=#fefefe
| 313717 ||  || — || October 18, 2003 || Kitt Peak || Spacewatch || FLO || align=right data-sort-value="0.79" | 790 m || 
|-id=718 bgcolor=#fefefe
| 313718 ||  || — || October 19, 2003 || Kitt Peak || Spacewatch || — || align=right data-sort-value="0.85" | 850 m || 
|-id=719 bgcolor=#fefefe
| 313719 ||  || — || October 18, 2003 || Palomar || NEAT || — || align=right | 1.1 km || 
|-id=720 bgcolor=#E9E9E9
| 313720 ||  || — || October 19, 2003 || Palomar || NEAT || — || align=right data-sort-value="0.86" | 860 m || 
|-id=721 bgcolor=#fefefe
| 313721 ||  || — || October 20, 2003 || Socorro || LINEAR || NYS || align=right | 1.1 km || 
|-id=722 bgcolor=#fefefe
| 313722 ||  || — || October 21, 2003 || Socorro || LINEAR || NYS || align=right data-sort-value="0.88" | 880 m || 
|-id=723 bgcolor=#fefefe
| 313723 ||  || — || October 21, 2003 || Socorro || LINEAR || — || align=right | 1.1 km || 
|-id=724 bgcolor=#fefefe
| 313724 ||  || — || October 21, 2003 || Kitt Peak || Spacewatch || V || align=right data-sort-value="0.88" | 880 m || 
|-id=725 bgcolor=#fefefe
| 313725 ||  || — || October 21, 2003 || Socorro || LINEAR || NYS || align=right data-sort-value="0.89" | 890 m || 
|-id=726 bgcolor=#fefefe
| 313726 ||  || — || October 22, 2003 || Kitt Peak || Spacewatch || V || align=right data-sort-value="0.57" | 570 m || 
|-id=727 bgcolor=#fefefe
| 313727 ||  || — || October 19, 2003 || Kitt Peak || Spacewatch || NYS || align=right | 1.0 km || 
|-id=728 bgcolor=#fefefe
| 313728 ||  || — || October 20, 2003 || Palomar || NEAT || — || align=right | 1.1 km || 
|-id=729 bgcolor=#fefefe
| 313729 ||  || — || October 21, 2003 || Kitt Peak || Spacewatch || MAS || align=right | 1.0 km || 
|-id=730 bgcolor=#fefefe
| 313730 ||  || — || October 21, 2003 || Anderson Mesa || LONEOS || — || align=right data-sort-value="0.75" | 750 m || 
|-id=731 bgcolor=#fefefe
| 313731 ||  || — || October 21, 2003 || Palomar || NEAT || NYS || align=right data-sort-value="0.89" | 890 m || 
|-id=732 bgcolor=#fefefe
| 313732 ||  || — || October 22, 2003 || Socorro || LINEAR || MAS || align=right | 1.1 km || 
|-id=733 bgcolor=#fefefe
| 313733 ||  || — || October 23, 2003 || Anderson Mesa || LONEOS || — || align=right data-sort-value="0.98" | 980 m || 
|-id=734 bgcolor=#fefefe
| 313734 ||  || — || October 21, 2003 || Kitt Peak || Spacewatch || NYS || align=right | 1.3 km || 
|-id=735 bgcolor=#fefefe
| 313735 ||  || — || October 21, 2003 || Socorro || LINEAR || — || align=right data-sort-value="0.94" | 940 m || 
|-id=736 bgcolor=#fefefe
| 313736 ||  || — || October 21, 2003 || Socorro || LINEAR || NYS || align=right data-sort-value="0.72" | 720 m || 
|-id=737 bgcolor=#fefefe
| 313737 ||  || — || October 21, 2003 || Socorro || LINEAR || — || align=right | 1.2 km || 
|-id=738 bgcolor=#fefefe
| 313738 ||  || — || October 23, 2003 || Anderson Mesa || LONEOS || MAS || align=right data-sort-value="0.81" | 810 m || 
|-id=739 bgcolor=#fefefe
| 313739 ||  || — || October 24, 2003 || Socorro || LINEAR || V || align=right data-sort-value="0.76" | 760 m || 
|-id=740 bgcolor=#fefefe
| 313740 ||  || — || October 21, 2003 || Kitt Peak || Spacewatch || — || align=right data-sort-value="0.77" | 770 m || 
|-id=741 bgcolor=#fefefe
| 313741 ||  || — || October 22, 2003 || Kitt Peak || Spacewatch || NYS || align=right data-sort-value="0.76" | 760 m || 
|-id=742 bgcolor=#fefefe
| 313742 ||  || — || October 23, 2003 || Kitt Peak || Spacewatch || — || align=right data-sort-value="0.98" | 980 m || 
|-id=743 bgcolor=#fefefe
| 313743 ||  || — || October 23, 2003 || Anderson Mesa || LONEOS || — || align=right | 1.2 km || 
|-id=744 bgcolor=#fefefe
| 313744 ||  || — || October 24, 2003 || Socorro || LINEAR || NYS || align=right data-sort-value="0.86" | 860 m || 
|-id=745 bgcolor=#fefefe
| 313745 ||  || — || October 24, 2003 || Socorro || LINEAR || NYS || align=right data-sort-value="0.90" | 900 m || 
|-id=746 bgcolor=#fefefe
| 313746 ||  || — || October 24, 2003 || Kitt Peak || Spacewatch || — || align=right | 1.1 km || 
|-id=747 bgcolor=#fefefe
| 313747 ||  || — || October 25, 2003 || Socorro || LINEAR || — || align=right data-sort-value="0.86" | 860 m || 
|-id=748 bgcolor=#fefefe
| 313748 ||  || — || October 25, 2003 || Socorro || LINEAR || — || align=right data-sort-value="0.90" | 900 m || 
|-id=749 bgcolor=#fefefe
| 313749 ||  || — || October 28, 2003 || Socorro || LINEAR || V || align=right data-sort-value="0.87" | 870 m || 
|-id=750 bgcolor=#fefefe
| 313750 ||  || — || October 17, 2003 || Goodricke-Pigott || R. A. Tucker || — || align=right | 1.0 km || 
|-id=751 bgcolor=#fefefe
| 313751 ||  || — || October 18, 2003 || Kitt Peak || Spacewatch || NYS || align=right data-sort-value="0.82" | 820 m || 
|-id=752 bgcolor=#fefefe
| 313752 ||  || — || October 20, 2003 || Kitt Peak || Spacewatch || — || align=right data-sort-value="0.90" | 900 m || 
|-id=753 bgcolor=#d6d6d6
| 313753 ||  || — || October 22, 2003 || Apache Point || SDSS || LUT || align=right | 5.8 km || 
|-id=754 bgcolor=#fefefe
| 313754 ||  || — || October 23, 2003 || Apache Point || SDSS || — || align=right data-sort-value="0.96" | 960 m || 
|-id=755 bgcolor=#fefefe
| 313755 ||  || — || November 15, 2003 || Kitt Peak || Spacewatch || MAS || align=right data-sort-value="0.90" | 900 m || 
|-id=756 bgcolor=#fefefe
| 313756 ||  || — || January 10, 1997 || Kitt Peak || Spacewatch || V || align=right data-sort-value="0.83" | 830 m || 
|-id=757 bgcolor=#fefefe
| 313757 ||  || — || November 19, 2003 || Kitt Peak || Spacewatch || MAS || align=right data-sort-value="0.73" | 730 m || 
|-id=758 bgcolor=#fefefe
| 313758 ||  || — || November 18, 2003 || Kitt Peak || Spacewatch || NYS || align=right data-sort-value="0.81" | 810 m || 
|-id=759 bgcolor=#fefefe
| 313759 ||  || — || November 20, 2003 || Socorro || LINEAR || — || align=right data-sort-value="0.92" | 920 m || 
|-id=760 bgcolor=#FA8072
| 313760 ||  || — || November 24, 2003 || Socorro || LINEAR || — || align=right | 1.8 km || 
|-id=761 bgcolor=#fefefe
| 313761 ||  || — || November 20, 2003 || Socorro || LINEAR || V || align=right | 1.1 km || 
|-id=762 bgcolor=#fefefe
| 313762 ||  || — || November 20, 2003 || Socorro || LINEAR || — || align=right | 1.0 km || 
|-id=763 bgcolor=#fefefe
| 313763 ||  || — || November 20, 2003 || Socorro || LINEAR || NYS || align=right data-sort-value="0.86" | 860 m || 
|-id=764 bgcolor=#fefefe
| 313764 ||  || — || November 21, 2003 || Kitt Peak || Spacewatch || NYS || align=right data-sort-value="0.84" | 840 m || 
|-id=765 bgcolor=#fefefe
| 313765 ||  || — || November 21, 2003 || Socorro || LINEAR || NYS || align=right data-sort-value="0.76" | 760 m || 
|-id=766 bgcolor=#fefefe
| 313766 ||  || — || November 29, 2003 || Kitt Peak || Spacewatch || — || align=right | 2.5 km || 
|-id=767 bgcolor=#fefefe
| 313767 ||  || — || November 19, 2003 || Catalina || CSS || — || align=right data-sort-value="0.97" | 970 m || 
|-id=768 bgcolor=#fefefe
| 313768 ||  || — || November 20, 2003 || Socorro || LINEAR || NYS || align=right data-sort-value="0.84" | 840 m || 
|-id=769 bgcolor=#fefefe
| 313769 ||  || — || December 15, 2003 || Socorro || LINEAR || H || align=right data-sort-value="0.95" | 950 m || 
|-id=770 bgcolor=#E9E9E9
| 313770 ||  || — || December 14, 2003 || Kitt Peak || Spacewatch || — || align=right | 1.6 km || 
|-id=771 bgcolor=#fefefe
| 313771 ||  || — || December 1, 2003 || Kitt Peak || Spacewatch || NYS || align=right data-sort-value="0.54" | 540 m || 
|-id=772 bgcolor=#fefefe
| 313772 ||  || — || December 17, 2003 || Socorro || LINEAR || H || align=right data-sort-value="0.74" | 740 m || 
|-id=773 bgcolor=#fefefe
| 313773 ||  || — || December 17, 2003 || Socorro || LINEAR || H || align=right | 1.2 km || 
|-id=774 bgcolor=#fefefe
| 313774 ||  || — || December 17, 2003 || Socorro || LINEAR || V || align=right data-sort-value="0.87" | 870 m || 
|-id=775 bgcolor=#fefefe
| 313775 ||  || — || December 17, 2003 || Socorro || LINEAR || — || align=right | 1.4 km || 
|-id=776 bgcolor=#fefefe
| 313776 ||  || — || December 17, 2003 || Kitt Peak || Spacewatch || EUT || align=right | 1.1 km || 
|-id=777 bgcolor=#fefefe
| 313777 ||  || — || December 17, 2003 || Kitt Peak || Spacewatch || — || align=right data-sort-value="0.98" | 980 m || 
|-id=778 bgcolor=#fefefe
| 313778 ||  || — || December 17, 2003 || Kitt Peak || Spacewatch || — || align=right data-sort-value="0.92" | 920 m || 
|-id=779 bgcolor=#fefefe
| 313779 ||  || — || December 18, 2003 || Socorro || LINEAR || — || align=right | 2.5 km || 
|-id=780 bgcolor=#fefefe
| 313780 ||  || — || December 18, 2003 || Socorro || LINEAR || — || align=right | 1.2 km || 
|-id=781 bgcolor=#fefefe
| 313781 ||  || — || December 17, 2003 || Socorro || LINEAR || V || align=right data-sort-value="0.90" | 900 m || 
|-id=782 bgcolor=#fefefe
| 313782 ||  || — || December 17, 2003 || Kitt Peak || Spacewatch || — || align=right data-sort-value="0.77" | 770 m || 
|-id=783 bgcolor=#fefefe
| 313783 ||  || — || December 18, 2003 || Socorro || LINEAR || — || align=right | 1.2 km || 
|-id=784 bgcolor=#E9E9E9
| 313784 ||  || — || December 19, 2003 || Socorro || LINEAR || — || align=right | 1.4 km || 
|-id=785 bgcolor=#fefefe
| 313785 ||  || — || December 20, 2003 || Socorro || LINEAR || H || align=right data-sort-value="0.82" | 820 m || 
|-id=786 bgcolor=#fefefe
| 313786 ||  || — || December 18, 2003 || Socorro || LINEAR || ERI || align=right | 2.8 km || 
|-id=787 bgcolor=#fefefe
| 313787 ||  || — || December 18, 2003 || Socorro || LINEAR || — || align=right | 1.3 km || 
|-id=788 bgcolor=#fefefe
| 313788 ||  || — || December 20, 2003 || Socorro || LINEAR || — || align=right | 1.6 km || 
|-id=789 bgcolor=#fefefe
| 313789 ||  || — || December 19, 2003 || Socorro || LINEAR || — || align=right | 1.1 km || 
|-id=790 bgcolor=#fefefe
| 313790 ||  || — || December 22, 2003 || Goodricke-Pigott || V. Reddy || CIM || align=right | 2.8 km || 
|-id=791 bgcolor=#fefefe
| 313791 ||  || — || December 27, 2003 || Socorro || LINEAR || H || align=right | 1.1 km || 
|-id=792 bgcolor=#E9E9E9
| 313792 ||  || — || December 28, 2003 || Socorro || LINEAR || — || align=right | 1.5 km || 
|-id=793 bgcolor=#E9E9E9
| 313793 ||  || — || December 29, 2003 || Socorro || LINEAR || — || align=right | 1.8 km || 
|-id=794 bgcolor=#E9E9E9
| 313794 ||  || — || December 30, 2003 || Socorro || LINEAR || GER || align=right | 2.0 km || 
|-id=795 bgcolor=#fefefe
| 313795 ||  || — || December 17, 2003 || Socorro || LINEAR || — || align=right | 1.4 km || 
|-id=796 bgcolor=#fefefe
| 313796 ||  || — || December 18, 2003 || Socorro || LINEAR || — || align=right | 1.5 km || 
|-id=797 bgcolor=#fefefe
| 313797 || 2004 AA || — || January 2, 2004 || Desert Moon || B. L. Stevens || MAS || align=right data-sort-value="0.80" | 800 m || 
|-id=798 bgcolor=#fefefe
| 313798 ||  || — || January 12, 2004 || Palomar || NEAT || H || align=right data-sort-value="0.99" | 990 m || 
|-id=799 bgcolor=#fefefe
| 313799 ||  || — || January 12, 2004 || Palomar || NEAT || H || align=right data-sort-value="0.88" | 880 m || 
|-id=800 bgcolor=#E9E9E9
| 313800 ||  || — || January 17, 2004 || Palomar || NEAT || — || align=right data-sort-value="0.91" | 910 m || 
|}

313801–313900 

|-bgcolor=#d6d6d6
| 313801 ||  || — || January 17, 2004 || Palomar || NEAT || SHU3:2 || align=right | 9.4 km || 
|-id=802 bgcolor=#E9E9E9
| 313802 ||  || — || January 16, 2004 || Kitt Peak || Spacewatch || GER || align=right | 1.9 km || 
|-id=803 bgcolor=#E9E9E9
| 313803 ||  || — || January 17, 2004 || Palomar || NEAT || — || align=right | 2.0 km || 
|-id=804 bgcolor=#E9E9E9
| 313804 ||  || — || January 17, 2004 || Palomar || NEAT || — || align=right data-sort-value="0.85" | 850 m || 
|-id=805 bgcolor=#E9E9E9
| 313805 ||  || — || January 18, 2004 || Kitt Peak || Spacewatch || — || align=right | 1.4 km || 
|-id=806 bgcolor=#E9E9E9
| 313806 ||  || — || January 17, 2004 || Palomar || NEAT || — || align=right | 3.3 km || 
|-id=807 bgcolor=#E9E9E9
| 313807 ||  || — || January 19, 2004 || Kitt Peak || Spacewatch || — || align=right | 1.2 km || 
|-id=808 bgcolor=#E9E9E9
| 313808 ||  || — || January 21, 2004 || Kitt Peak || Spacewatch || — || align=right | 1.4 km || 
|-id=809 bgcolor=#FFC2E0
| 313809 ||  || — || January 22, 2004 || Socorro || LINEAR || APO || align=right data-sort-value="0.50" | 500 m || 
|-id=810 bgcolor=#E9E9E9
| 313810 ||  || — || January 23, 2004 || Anderson Mesa || LONEOS || BAR || align=right | 1.9 km || 
|-id=811 bgcolor=#E9E9E9
| 313811 ||  || — || January 21, 2004 || Socorro || LINEAR || — || align=right | 2.4 km || 
|-id=812 bgcolor=#E9E9E9
| 313812 ||  || — || January 22, 2004 || Socorro || LINEAR || — || align=right | 1.1 km || 
|-id=813 bgcolor=#E9E9E9
| 313813 ||  || — || January 27, 2004 || Socorro || LINEAR || — || align=right | 3.8 km || 
|-id=814 bgcolor=#E9E9E9
| 313814 ||  || — || January 27, 2004 || Anderson Mesa || LONEOS || — || align=right | 1.9 km || 
|-id=815 bgcolor=#E9E9E9
| 313815 ||  || — || January 27, 2004 || Socorro || LINEAR || — || align=right | 1.1 km || 
|-id=816 bgcolor=#E9E9E9
| 313816 ||  || — || January 27, 2004 || Kitt Peak || Spacewatch || — || align=right | 1.3 km || 
|-id=817 bgcolor=#E9E9E9
| 313817 ||  || — || January 28, 2004 || Socorro || LINEAR || — || align=right | 1.9 km || 
|-id=818 bgcolor=#E9E9E9
| 313818 ||  || — || January 30, 2004 || Socorro || LINEAR || — || align=right | 1.4 km || 
|-id=819 bgcolor=#E9E9E9
| 313819 ||  || — || January 30, 2004 || Anderson Mesa || LONEOS || JUN || align=right | 1.3 km || 
|-id=820 bgcolor=#E9E9E9
| 313820 ||  || — || January 17, 2004 || Palomar || NEAT || — || align=right | 1.6 km || 
|-id=821 bgcolor=#E9E9E9
| 313821 ||  || — || January 16, 2004 || Kitt Peak || Spacewatch || — || align=right data-sort-value="0.94" | 940 m || 
|-id=822 bgcolor=#d6d6d6
| 313822 ||  || — || January 22, 2004 || Socorro || LINEAR || 3:2 || align=right | 6.5 km || 
|-id=823 bgcolor=#fefefe
| 313823 ||  || — || February 10, 2004 || Palomar || NEAT || H || align=right data-sort-value="0.71" | 710 m || 
|-id=824 bgcolor=#fefefe
| 313824 ||  || — || February 10, 2004 || Palomar || NEAT || H || align=right | 1.3 km || 
|-id=825 bgcolor=#fefefe
| 313825 ||  || — || February 11, 2004 || Palomar || NEAT || H || align=right data-sort-value="0.77" | 770 m || 
|-id=826 bgcolor=#E9E9E9
| 313826 ||  || — || February 10, 2004 || Palomar || NEAT || MAR || align=right | 1.6 km || 
|-id=827 bgcolor=#E9E9E9
| 313827 ||  || — || February 10, 2004 || Palomar || NEAT || — || align=right | 1.4 km || 
|-id=828 bgcolor=#E9E9E9
| 313828 ||  || — || February 11, 2004 || Anderson Mesa || LONEOS || — || align=right data-sort-value="0.97" | 970 m || 
|-id=829 bgcolor=#E9E9E9
| 313829 ||  || — || February 11, 2004 || Kitt Peak || Spacewatch || — || align=right | 1.1 km || 
|-id=830 bgcolor=#E9E9E9
| 313830 ||  || — || February 11, 2004 || Catalina || CSS || — || align=right | 1.2 km || 
|-id=831 bgcolor=#fefefe
| 313831 ||  || — || February 12, 2004 || Kitt Peak || Spacewatch || — || align=right | 1.2 km || 
|-id=832 bgcolor=#E9E9E9
| 313832 ||  || — || February 11, 2004 || Palomar || NEAT || — || align=right | 1.3 km || 
|-id=833 bgcolor=#E9E9E9
| 313833 ||  || — || February 9, 2004 || Anderson Mesa || LONEOS || — || align=right | 3.9 km || 
|-id=834 bgcolor=#fefefe
| 313834 ||  || — || February 10, 2004 || Palomar || NEAT || H || align=right data-sort-value="0.75" | 750 m || 
|-id=835 bgcolor=#fefefe
| 313835 ||  || — || February 11, 2004 || Catalina || CSS || — || align=right data-sort-value="0.58" | 580 m || 
|-id=836 bgcolor=#E9E9E9
| 313836 ||  || — || February 13, 2004 || Kitt Peak || Spacewatch || — || align=right | 1.2 km || 
|-id=837 bgcolor=#E9E9E9
| 313837 ||  || — || February 15, 2004 || Catalina || CSS || — || align=right | 1.3 km || 
|-id=838 bgcolor=#fefefe
| 313838 ||  || — || February 18, 2004 || Socorro || LINEAR || H || align=right | 1.0 km || 
|-id=839 bgcolor=#fefefe
| 313839 ||  || — || February 18, 2004 || Goodricke-Pigott || Goodricke-Pigott Obs. || H || align=right | 1.3 km || 
|-id=840 bgcolor=#fefefe
| 313840 ||  || — || February 18, 2004 || Socorro || LINEAR || H || align=right | 1.1 km || 
|-id=841 bgcolor=#E9E9E9
| 313841 ||  || — || February 18, 2004 || Socorro || LINEAR || — || align=right | 1.4 km || 
|-id=842 bgcolor=#fefefe
| 313842 ||  || — || February 19, 2004 || Socorro || LINEAR || H || align=right data-sort-value="0.79" | 790 m || 
|-id=843 bgcolor=#E9E9E9
| 313843 ||  || — || February 16, 2004 || Socorro || LINEAR || — || align=right | 1.2 km || 
|-id=844 bgcolor=#fefefe
| 313844 ||  || — || February 16, 2004 || Socorro || LINEAR || H || align=right data-sort-value="0.86" | 860 m || 
|-id=845 bgcolor=#fefefe
| 313845 ||  || — || February 23, 2004 || Socorro || LINEAR || — || align=right | 1.4 km || 
|-id=846 bgcolor=#E9E9E9
| 313846 ||  || — || February 19, 2004 || Socorro || LINEAR || — || align=right | 2.4 km || 
|-id=847 bgcolor=#d6d6d6
| 313847 ||  || — || March 15, 2004 || Palomar || NEAT || BRA || align=right | 2.6 km || 
|-id=848 bgcolor=#fefefe
| 313848 ||  || — || March 15, 2004 || Kitt Peak || Spacewatch || H || align=right data-sort-value="0.64" | 640 m || 
|-id=849 bgcolor=#E9E9E9
| 313849 ||  || — || March 14, 2004 || Kitt Peak || Spacewatch || — || align=right | 1.0 km || 
|-id=850 bgcolor=#E9E9E9
| 313850 ||  || — || March 15, 2004 || Kitt Peak || Spacewatch || — || align=right | 1.3 km || 
|-id=851 bgcolor=#E9E9E9
| 313851 ||  || — || March 15, 2004 || Kitt Peak || Spacewatch || — || align=right data-sort-value="0.94" | 940 m || 
|-id=852 bgcolor=#E9E9E9
| 313852 ||  || — || March 15, 2004 || Catalina || CSS || — || align=right | 1.2 km || 
|-id=853 bgcolor=#E9E9E9
| 313853 ||  || — || March 13, 2004 || Palomar || NEAT || EUN || align=right | 1.4 km || 
|-id=854 bgcolor=#E9E9E9
| 313854 ||  || — || March 15, 2004 || Socorro || LINEAR || ADE || align=right | 3.3 km || 
|-id=855 bgcolor=#E9E9E9
| 313855 ||  || — || March 15, 2004 || Palomar || NEAT || HNS || align=right | 1.7 km || 
|-id=856 bgcolor=#fefefe
| 313856 ||  || — || March 16, 2004 || Catalina || CSS || H || align=right | 1.4 km || 
|-id=857 bgcolor=#E9E9E9
| 313857 ||  || — || March 16, 2004 || Socorro || LINEAR || — || align=right | 2.2 km || 
|-id=858 bgcolor=#E9E9E9
| 313858 ||  || — || March 16, 2004 || Campo Imperatore || CINEOS || — || align=right | 1.3 km || 
|-id=859 bgcolor=#E9E9E9
| 313859 ||  || — || March 19, 2004 || Socorro || LINEAR || — || align=right | 1.2 km || 
|-id=860 bgcolor=#E9E9E9
| 313860 ||  || — || March 20, 2004 || Socorro || LINEAR || — || align=right | 3.5 km || 
|-id=861 bgcolor=#E9E9E9
| 313861 ||  || — || March 26, 2004 || Kitt Peak || Spacewatch || — || align=right | 1.1 km || 
|-id=862 bgcolor=#E9E9E9
| 313862 ||  || — || March 23, 2004 || Socorro || LINEAR || — || align=right | 2.0 km || 
|-id=863 bgcolor=#fefefe
| 313863 ||  || — || March 26, 2004 || Socorro || LINEAR || H || align=right data-sort-value="0.68" | 680 m || 
|-id=864 bgcolor=#E9E9E9
| 313864 ||  || — || March 22, 2004 || Anderson Mesa || LONEOS || — || align=right | 2.2 km || 
|-id=865 bgcolor=#E9E9E9
| 313865 ||  || — || March 27, 2004 || Anderson Mesa || LONEOS || BRU || align=right | 3.1 km || 
|-id=866 bgcolor=#E9E9E9
| 313866 ||  || — || March 26, 2004 || Socorro || LINEAR || BAR || align=right | 1.7 km || 
|-id=867 bgcolor=#E9E9E9
| 313867 ||  || — || March 28, 2004 || Socorro || LINEAR || — || align=right | 1.8 km || 
|-id=868 bgcolor=#E9E9E9
| 313868 ||  || — || March 29, 2004 || Kitt Peak || Spacewatch || — || align=right | 1.0 km || 
|-id=869 bgcolor=#E9E9E9
| 313869 ||  || — || April 14, 2004 || Socorro || LINEAR || GER || align=right | 2.2 km || 
|-id=870 bgcolor=#E9E9E9
| 313870 ||  || — || April 14, 2004 || Anderson Mesa || LONEOS || — || align=right | 2.8 km || 
|-id=871 bgcolor=#E9E9E9
| 313871 ||  || — || April 14, 2004 || Socorro || LINEAR || — || align=right | 1.7 km || 
|-id=872 bgcolor=#E9E9E9
| 313872 ||  || — || April 15, 2004 || Socorro || LINEAR || — || align=right | 3.5 km || 
|-id=873 bgcolor=#E9E9E9
| 313873 ||  || — || April 12, 2004 || Palomar || NEAT || EUN || align=right | 2.1 km || 
|-id=874 bgcolor=#E9E9E9
| 313874 ||  || — || April 13, 2004 || Kitt Peak || Spacewatch || — || align=right | 1.6 km || 
|-id=875 bgcolor=#E9E9E9
| 313875 ||  || — || April 13, 2004 || Palomar || NEAT || — || align=right | 1.9 km || 
|-id=876 bgcolor=#E9E9E9
| 313876 ||  || — || April 12, 2004 || Kitt Peak || Spacewatch || — || align=right | 2.7 km || 
|-id=877 bgcolor=#E9E9E9
| 313877 ||  || — || April 12, 2004 || Kitt Peak || Spacewatch || — || align=right | 1.4 km || 
|-id=878 bgcolor=#E9E9E9
| 313878 ||  || — || April 2, 2004 || Haleakala || NEAT || — || align=right | 1.8 km || 
|-id=879 bgcolor=#E9E9E9
| 313879 ||  || — || April 15, 2004 || Socorro || LINEAR || MAR || align=right | 1.6 km || 
|-id=880 bgcolor=#E9E9E9
| 313880 ||  || — || April 13, 2004 || Palomar || NEAT || — || align=right | 2.1 km || 
|-id=881 bgcolor=#E9E9E9
| 313881 ||  || — || April 16, 2004 || Socorro || LINEAR || — || align=right | 3.9 km || 
|-id=882 bgcolor=#E9E9E9
| 313882 ||  || — || April 16, 2004 || Socorro || LINEAR || — || align=right | 1.1 km || 
|-id=883 bgcolor=#E9E9E9
| 313883 ||  || — || April 16, 2004 || Socorro || LINEAR || — || align=right | 1.9 km || 
|-id=884 bgcolor=#E9E9E9
| 313884 ||  || — || April 16, 2004 || Kitt Peak || Spacewatch || — || align=right | 1.5 km || 
|-id=885 bgcolor=#E9E9E9
| 313885 ||  || — || April 22, 2004 || Kitt Peak || Spacewatch || — || align=right | 1.8 km || 
|-id=886 bgcolor=#E9E9E9
| 313886 ||  || — || April 22, 2004 || Kitt Peak || Spacewatch || — || align=right data-sort-value="0.94" | 940 m || 
|-id=887 bgcolor=#E9E9E9
| 313887 ||  || — || April 22, 2004 || Siding Spring || SSS || — || align=right | 2.0 km || 
|-id=888 bgcolor=#E9E9E9
| 313888 ||  || — || April 22, 2004 || Siding Spring || SSS || — || align=right | 2.3 km || 
|-id=889 bgcolor=#E9E9E9
| 313889 ||  || — || April 26, 2004 || Siding Spring || SSS || — || align=right | 2.8 km || 
|-id=890 bgcolor=#E9E9E9
| 313890 ||  || — || April 20, 2004 || Kitt Peak || Spacewatch || — || align=right | 2.2 km || 
|-id=891 bgcolor=#E9E9E9
| 313891 ||  || — || April 24, 2004 || Socorro || LINEAR || — || align=right | 3.4 km || 
|-id=892 bgcolor=#E9E9E9
| 313892 Furnish || 2004 JF ||  || May 8, 2004 || Wrightwood || J. W. Young || — || align=right | 1.8 km || 
|-id=893 bgcolor=#E9E9E9
| 313893 ||  || — || May 12, 2004 || Catalina || CSS || RAF || align=right | 1.5 km || 
|-id=894 bgcolor=#E9E9E9
| 313894 ||  || — || May 13, 2004 || Kitt Peak || Spacewatch || — || align=right | 1.8 km || 
|-id=895 bgcolor=#E9E9E9
| 313895 ||  || — || May 24, 2004 || Socorro || LINEAR || — || align=right | 2.9 km || 
|-id=896 bgcolor=#C2FFFF
| 313896 ||  || — || May 21, 2004 || Campo Imperatore || CINEOS || L4 || align=right | 15 km || 
|-id=897 bgcolor=#E9E9E9
| 313897 ||  || — || June 11, 2004 || Socorro || LINEAR || — || align=right | 2.1 km || 
|-id=898 bgcolor=#d6d6d6
| 313898 ||  || — || June 10, 2004 || Anderson Mesa || LONEOS || — || align=right | 4.3 km || 
|-id=899 bgcolor=#E9E9E9
| 313899 ||  || — || June 11, 2004 || Kitt Peak || Spacewatch || JUN || align=right | 1.5 km || 
|-id=900 bgcolor=#E9E9E9
| 313900 ||  || — || July 12, 2004 || Reedy Creek || J. Broughton || — || align=right | 2.6 km || 
|}

313901–314000 

|-bgcolor=#E9E9E9
| 313901 ||  || — || July 11, 2004 || Socorro || LINEAR || — || align=right | 2.4 km || 
|-id=902 bgcolor=#E9E9E9
| 313902 ||  || — || July 11, 2004 || Socorro || LINEAR || EUN || align=right | 1.6 km || 
|-id=903 bgcolor=#E9E9E9
| 313903 ||  || — || July 14, 2004 || Socorro || LINEAR || — || align=right | 3.3 km || 
|-id=904 bgcolor=#d6d6d6
| 313904 ||  || — || July 11, 2004 || Socorro || LINEAR || — || align=right | 4.7 km || 
|-id=905 bgcolor=#d6d6d6
| 313905 ||  || — || July 14, 2004 || Socorro || LINEAR || — || align=right | 4.9 km || 
|-id=906 bgcolor=#d6d6d6
| 313906 ||  || — || August 7, 2004 || Charleston || R. Holmes || — || align=right | 3.9 km || 
|-id=907 bgcolor=#d6d6d6
| 313907 ||  || — || August 9, 2004 || Bergisch Gladbach || W. Bickel || — || align=right | 3.0 km || 
|-id=908 bgcolor=#d6d6d6
| 313908 ||  || — || August 7, 2004 || Palomar || NEAT || — || align=right | 3.2 km || 
|-id=909 bgcolor=#d6d6d6
| 313909 ||  || — || August 8, 2004 || Palomar || NEAT || — || align=right | 4.2 km || 
|-id=910 bgcolor=#d6d6d6
| 313910 ||  || — || August 10, 2004 || Socorro || LINEAR || EOS || align=right | 2.8 km || 
|-id=911 bgcolor=#E9E9E9
| 313911 ||  || — || August 8, 2004 || Socorro || LINEAR || — || align=right | 3.2 km || 
|-id=912 bgcolor=#d6d6d6
| 313912 ||  || — || August 9, 2004 || Socorro || LINEAR || — || align=right | 3.5 km || 
|-id=913 bgcolor=#d6d6d6
| 313913 ||  || — || August 10, 2004 || Socorro || LINEAR || — || align=right | 4.6 km || 
|-id=914 bgcolor=#fefefe
| 313914 ||  || — || August 12, 2004 || Socorro || LINEAR || — || align=right | 1.1 km || 
|-id=915 bgcolor=#fefefe
| 313915 ||  || — || August 10, 2004 || Socorro || LINEAR || FLO || align=right data-sort-value="0.65" | 650 m || 
|-id=916 bgcolor=#d6d6d6
| 313916 ||  || — || August 9, 2004 || Palomar || NEAT || — || align=right | 4.8 km || 
|-id=917 bgcolor=#d6d6d6
| 313917 ||  || — || August 22, 2004 || Bergisch Gladbac || W. Bickel || — || align=right | 3.7 km || 
|-id=918 bgcolor=#d6d6d6
| 313918 ||  || — || August 24, 2004 || Socorro || LINEAR || Tj (2.97) || align=right | 5.2 km || 
|-id=919 bgcolor=#d6d6d6
| 313919 ||  || — || August 21, 2004 || Siding Spring || SSS || — || align=right | 3.1 km || 
|-id=920 bgcolor=#d6d6d6
| 313920 ||  || — || September 3, 2004 || Palomar || NEAT || — || align=right | 3.6 km || 
|-id=921 bgcolor=#d6d6d6
| 313921 Daassou ||  ||  || September 5, 2004 || Vicques || M. Ory || — || align=right | 2.6 km || 
|-id=922 bgcolor=#d6d6d6
| 313922 ||  || — || September 5, 2004 || Palomar || NEAT || TIR || align=right | 4.3 km || 
|-id=923 bgcolor=#d6d6d6
| 313923 ||  || — || September 7, 2004 || Kitt Peak || Spacewatch || EOS || align=right | 2.4 km || 
|-id=924 bgcolor=#d6d6d6
| 313924 ||  || — || September 4, 2004 || Palomar || NEAT || — || align=right | 3.7 km || 
|-id=925 bgcolor=#d6d6d6
| 313925 ||  || — || September 7, 2004 || Kitt Peak || Spacewatch || — || align=right | 2.6 km || 
|-id=926 bgcolor=#d6d6d6
| 313926 ||  || — || September 8, 2004 || Socorro || LINEAR || — || align=right | 4.5 km || 
|-id=927 bgcolor=#d6d6d6
| 313927 ||  || — || September 8, 2004 || Socorro || LINEAR || — || align=right | 4.7 km || 
|-id=928 bgcolor=#d6d6d6
| 313928 ||  || — || September 8, 2004 || Socorro || LINEAR || — || align=right | 3.4 km || 
|-id=929 bgcolor=#d6d6d6
| 313929 ||  || — || September 8, 2004 || Socorro || LINEAR || — || align=right | 5.3 km || 
|-id=930 bgcolor=#d6d6d6
| 313930 ||  || — || September 7, 2004 || Bergisch Gladbac || W. Bickel || — || align=right | 3.8 km || 
|-id=931 bgcolor=#d6d6d6
| 313931 ||  || — || September 8, 2004 || Socorro || LINEAR || — || align=right | 3.1 km || 
|-id=932 bgcolor=#E9E9E9
| 313932 ||  || — || September 8, 2004 || Socorro || LINEAR || — || align=right | 2.9 km || 
|-id=933 bgcolor=#d6d6d6
| 313933 ||  || — || September 8, 2004 || Socorro || LINEAR || — || align=right | 3.1 km || 
|-id=934 bgcolor=#d6d6d6
| 313934 ||  || — || September 8, 2004 || Socorro || LINEAR || — || align=right | 3.3 km || 
|-id=935 bgcolor=#d6d6d6
| 313935 ||  || — || September 8, 2004 || Socorro || LINEAR || — || align=right | 3.3 km || 
|-id=936 bgcolor=#d6d6d6
| 313936 ||  || — || September 8, 2004 || Socorro || LINEAR || — || align=right | 3.8 km || 
|-id=937 bgcolor=#d6d6d6
| 313937 ||  || — || September 8, 2004 || Socorro || LINEAR || — || align=right | 2.7 km || 
|-id=938 bgcolor=#d6d6d6
| 313938 ||  || — || September 8, 2004 || Socorro || LINEAR || EOS || align=right | 2.8 km || 
|-id=939 bgcolor=#d6d6d6
| 313939 ||  || — || September 8, 2004 || Socorro || LINEAR || HYG || align=right | 3.6 km || 
|-id=940 bgcolor=#d6d6d6
| 313940 ||  || — || September 7, 2004 || Kitt Peak || Spacewatch || — || align=right | 3.6 km || 
|-id=941 bgcolor=#d6d6d6
| 313941 ||  || — || September 9, 2004 || Socorro || LINEAR || — || align=right | 3.0 km || 
|-id=942 bgcolor=#d6d6d6
| 313942 ||  || — || September 9, 2004 || Socorro || LINEAR || — || align=right | 4.3 km || 
|-id=943 bgcolor=#d6d6d6
| 313943 ||  || — || September 9, 2004 || Kitt Peak || Spacewatch || — || align=right | 2.7 km || 
|-id=944 bgcolor=#d6d6d6
| 313944 ||  || — || September 10, 2004 || Socorro || LINEAR || — || align=right | 4.7 km || 
|-id=945 bgcolor=#d6d6d6
| 313945 ||  || — || September 10, 2004 || Socorro || LINEAR || EOS || align=right | 2.0 km || 
|-id=946 bgcolor=#d6d6d6
| 313946 ||  || — || September 10, 2004 || Socorro || LINEAR || — || align=right | 5.2 km || 
|-id=947 bgcolor=#d6d6d6
| 313947 ||  || — || September 10, 2004 || Socorro || LINEAR || — || align=right | 2.7 km || 
|-id=948 bgcolor=#d6d6d6
| 313948 ||  || — || September 10, 2004 || Socorro || LINEAR || CRO || align=right | 3.8 km || 
|-id=949 bgcolor=#d6d6d6
| 313949 ||  || — || September 10, 2004 || Socorro || LINEAR || — || align=right | 3.7 km || 
|-id=950 bgcolor=#fefefe
| 313950 ||  || — || September 10, 2004 || Socorro || LINEAR || V || align=right data-sort-value="0.80" | 800 m || 
|-id=951 bgcolor=#d6d6d6
| 313951 ||  || — || September 10, 2004 || Socorro || LINEAR || — || align=right | 5.3 km || 
|-id=952 bgcolor=#d6d6d6
| 313952 ||  || — || September 10, 2004 || Socorro || LINEAR || EOS || align=right | 2.8 km || 
|-id=953 bgcolor=#d6d6d6
| 313953 ||  || — || September 10, 2004 || Socorro || LINEAR || — || align=right | 4.3 km || 
|-id=954 bgcolor=#d6d6d6
| 313954 ||  || — || September 12, 2004 || Socorro || LINEAR || — || align=right | 3.7 km || 
|-id=955 bgcolor=#d6d6d6
| 313955 ||  || — || September 11, 2004 || Socorro || LINEAR || — || align=right | 3.8 km || 
|-id=956 bgcolor=#d6d6d6
| 313956 ||  || — || September 10, 2004 || Kitt Peak || Spacewatch || EOS || align=right | 2.2 km || 
|-id=957 bgcolor=#d6d6d6
| 313957 ||  || — || September 13, 2004 || Socorro || LINEAR || HYG || align=right | 3.0 km || 
|-id=958 bgcolor=#d6d6d6
| 313958 ||  || — || September 6, 2004 || Palomar || NEAT || — || align=right | 4.3 km || 
|-id=959 bgcolor=#d6d6d6
| 313959 ||  || — || September 11, 2004 || Kitt Peak || Spacewatch || — || align=right | 2.8 km || 
|-id=960 bgcolor=#d6d6d6
| 313960 ||  || — || September 11, 2004 || Kitt Peak || Spacewatch || — || align=right | 3.1 km || 
|-id=961 bgcolor=#d6d6d6
| 313961 ||  || — || September 13, 2004 || Socorro || LINEAR || — || align=right | 5.3 km || 
|-id=962 bgcolor=#d6d6d6
| 313962 ||  || — || September 15, 2004 || Socorro || LINEAR || EUP || align=right | 4.9 km || 
|-id=963 bgcolor=#d6d6d6
| 313963 ||  || — || September 7, 2004 || Kitt Peak || Spacewatch || — || align=right | 3.2 km || 
|-id=964 bgcolor=#d6d6d6
| 313964 ||  || — || September 6, 2004 || Socorro || LINEAR || — || align=right | 7.4 km || 
|-id=965 bgcolor=#d6d6d6
| 313965 ||  || — || September 14, 2004 || Socorro || LINEAR || — || align=right | 5.3 km || 
|-id=966 bgcolor=#d6d6d6
| 313966 ||  || — || September 8, 2004 || Socorro || LINEAR || EOS || align=right | 2.8 km || 
|-id=967 bgcolor=#d6d6d6
| 313967 ||  || — || September 16, 2004 || Kitt Peak || Spacewatch || — || align=right | 2.9 km || 
|-id=968 bgcolor=#d6d6d6
| 313968 ||  || — || September 17, 2004 || Socorro || LINEAR || — || align=right | 3.8 km || 
|-id=969 bgcolor=#d6d6d6
| 313969 ||  || — || September 17, 2004 || Kitt Peak || Spacewatch || — || align=right | 3.0 km || 
|-id=970 bgcolor=#fefefe
| 313970 ||  || — || September 18, 2004 || Socorro || LINEAR || — || align=right data-sort-value="0.96" | 960 m || 
|-id=971 bgcolor=#d6d6d6
| 313971 ||  || — || September 10, 2004 || Socorro || LINEAR || — || align=right | 3.5 km || 
|-id=972 bgcolor=#d6d6d6
| 313972 ||  || — || October 2, 2004 || Palomar || NEAT || — || align=right | 4.2 km || 
|-id=973 bgcolor=#d6d6d6
| 313973 ||  || — || October 8, 2004 || Socorro || LINEAR || — || align=right | 4.1 km || 
|-id=974 bgcolor=#fefefe
| 313974 ||  || — || October 5, 2004 || Kitt Peak || Spacewatch || — || align=right data-sort-value="0.78" | 780 m || 
|-id=975 bgcolor=#d6d6d6
| 313975 ||  || — || October 5, 2004 || Kitt Peak || Spacewatch || — || align=right | 2.8 km || 
|-id=976 bgcolor=#fefefe
| 313976 ||  || — || October 5, 2004 || Anderson Mesa || LONEOS || NYS || align=right data-sort-value="0.62" | 620 m || 
|-id=977 bgcolor=#fefefe
| 313977 ||  || — || October 5, 2004 || Kitt Peak || Spacewatch || — || align=right data-sort-value="0.67" | 670 m || 
|-id=978 bgcolor=#fefefe
| 313978 ||  || — || October 5, 2004 || Anderson Mesa || LONEOS || V || align=right | 1.0 km || 
|-id=979 bgcolor=#d6d6d6
| 313979 ||  || — || October 4, 2004 || Socorro || LINEAR || — || align=right | 4.9 km || 
|-id=980 bgcolor=#d6d6d6
| 313980 ||  || — || October 5, 2004 || Kitt Peak || Spacewatch || — || align=right | 3.6 km || 
|-id=981 bgcolor=#d6d6d6
| 313981 ||  || — || October 5, 2004 || Kitt Peak || Spacewatch || — || align=right | 3.3 km || 
|-id=982 bgcolor=#d6d6d6
| 313982 ||  || — || October 5, 2004 || Kitt Peak || Spacewatch || — || align=right | 4.3 km || 
|-id=983 bgcolor=#d6d6d6
| 313983 ||  || — || October 5, 2004 || Kitt Peak || Spacewatch || — || align=right | 3.6 km || 
|-id=984 bgcolor=#d6d6d6
| 313984 ||  || — || October 5, 2004 || Kitt Peak || Spacewatch || — || align=right | 5.3 km || 
|-id=985 bgcolor=#d6d6d6
| 313985 ||  || — || October 6, 2004 || Palomar || NEAT || EMA || align=right | 4.2 km || 
|-id=986 bgcolor=#d6d6d6
| 313986 ||  || — || September 15, 2004 || Socorro || LINEAR || — || align=right | 4.0 km || 
|-id=987 bgcolor=#d6d6d6
| 313987 ||  || — || October 7, 2004 || Socorro || LINEAR || — || align=right | 3.9 km || 
|-id=988 bgcolor=#fefefe
| 313988 ||  || — || October 7, 2004 || Anderson Mesa || LONEOS || ERI || align=right | 2.2 km || 
|-id=989 bgcolor=#d6d6d6
| 313989 ||  || — || October 9, 2004 || Anderson Mesa || LONEOS || — || align=right | 4.0 km || 
|-id=990 bgcolor=#d6d6d6
| 313990 ||  || — || October 6, 2004 || Kitt Peak || Spacewatch || — || align=right | 3.9 km || 
|-id=991 bgcolor=#d6d6d6
| 313991 ||  || — || October 8, 2004 || Socorro || LINEAR || — || align=right | 4.5 km || 
|-id=992 bgcolor=#d6d6d6
| 313992 ||  || — || October 7, 2004 || Kitt Peak || Spacewatch || — || align=right | 4.4 km || 
|-id=993 bgcolor=#d6d6d6
| 313993 ||  || — || October 7, 2004 || Kitt Peak || Spacewatch || URS || align=right | 4.3 km || 
|-id=994 bgcolor=#fefefe
| 313994 ||  || — || October 7, 2004 || Kitt Peak || Spacewatch || — || align=right data-sort-value="0.74" | 740 m || 
|-id=995 bgcolor=#fefefe
| 313995 ||  || — || October 8, 2004 || Kitt Peak || Spacewatch || — || align=right data-sort-value="0.93" | 930 m || 
|-id=996 bgcolor=#d6d6d6
| 313996 ||  || — || October 8, 2004 || Kitt Peak || Spacewatch || — || align=right | 2.7 km || 
|-id=997 bgcolor=#fefefe
| 313997 ||  || — || October 9, 2004 || Kitt Peak || Spacewatch || — || align=right data-sort-value="0.67" | 670 m || 
|-id=998 bgcolor=#d6d6d6
| 313998 ||  || — || October 9, 2004 || Kitt Peak || Spacewatch || — || align=right | 3.9 km || 
|-id=999 bgcolor=#fefefe
| 313999 ||  || — || October 11, 2004 || Kitt Peak || Spacewatch || — || align=right | 1.0 km || 
|-id=000 bgcolor=#d6d6d6
| 314000 ||  || — || October 15, 2004 || Anderson Mesa || LONEOS || — || align=right | 5.2 km || 
|}

References

External links 
 Discovery Circumstances: Numbered Minor Planets (310001)–(315000) (IAU Minor Planet Center)

0313